= 3040 =

3040 may refer to:

- 3040, a number in the 3000 (number) range
- A.D. 3040, a year of the 4th millennium CE
- 3040 BC, a year in the 4th millennium BCE

== Roads numbered 3040 ==
- Hawaii Route 3040, a state highway
- Louisiana Highway 3040, a state highway
- Texas Farm to Market Road 3040, a state highway
- A3040 road (Great Britain)

== Other uses ==
- 3040 Kozai, a near-Mars asteroid, the 3040th asteroid registered
- Commodore 3040, a floppy drive unit
- 3040th Aircraft Storage Group of the U.S. Air Force

== See also ==
- German submarine U-3040, a WWII Kriegsmarine submarine
