= German submarine U-926 =

German World War II submarine

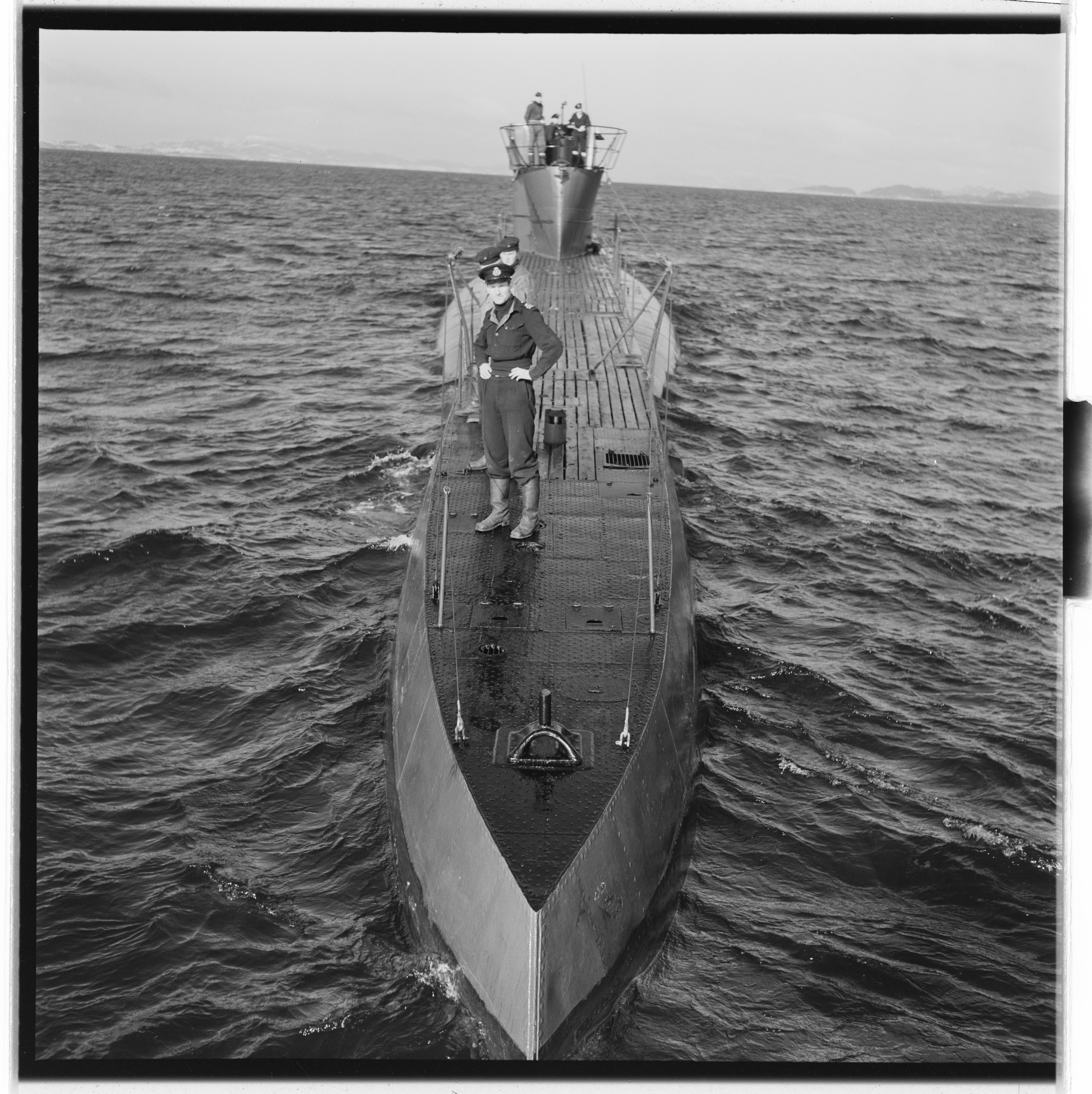
- HNoMS Kya (ex U-926) in 1954

History

Nazi Germany
- Name: U-926
- Ordered: 25 August 1941
- Builder: Neptun Werft AG, Rostock
- Yard number: 513
- Laid down: 1 July 1942
- Launched: 28 December 1943
- Commissioned: 29 February 1944
- Fate: Surrendered on 9 May 1945; Transferred to Norway on 10 January 1949

Norway
- Name: HNoMS Kya (S307)
- Acquired: 10 January 1949
- Fate: Retired in 1962

General characteristics
- Class & type: Type VIIC submarine
- Displacement: 769 tonnes (757 long tons) surfaced; 871 t (857 long tons) submerged
- Length: 67.10 m (220 ft 2 in) o/a; 50.50 m (165 ft 8 in) pressure hull
- Beam: 6.20 m (20 ft 4 in) o/a; 4.70 m (15 ft 5 in) pressure hull
- Height: 9.60 m (31 ft 6 in)
- Draught: 4.74 m (15 ft 7 in)
- Installed power: 2,800–3,200 PS (2,100–2,400 kW; 2,800–3,200 bhp) (diesels); 750 PS (550 kW; 740 shp) (electric)
- Propulsion: 2 shafts; 2 × diesel engines; 2 × electric motors
- Speed: 17.7 knots (32.8 km/h; 20.4 mph) surfaced; 7.6 knots (14.1 km/h; 8.7 mph) submerged
- Range: 8,500 nmi (15,700 km; 9,800 mi) at 10 knots (19 km/h; 12 mph) surfaced; 80 nmi (150 km; 92 mi) at 4 knots (7.4 km/h; 4.6 mph) submerged
- Test depth: 220 m (720 ft); Crush depth: 250–295 m (820–968 ft)
- Complement: 4 officers, 44–52 enlisted
- Armament: 5 × 53.3 cm (21 in) torpedo tubes (four bow, one stern); 14 × torpedoes or; 26 TMA mines; 1 × 8.8 cm (3.46 in) deck gun (220 rounds); 1 × 3.7 cm (1.5 in) Flak M42 AA gun; 2 × twin 2 cm (0.79 in) C/30 anti-aircraft guns

Service record (Kriegsmarine)
- Part of: 4th U-boat Flotilla; 29 February 1944 – 14 March 1945; 11th U-boat Flotilla; 15 March – 8 May 1945
- Identification codes: M 50 939
- Commanders: Oblt.z.S. Eberhard von Wenden; 29 February – 31 July 1944; Oblt.z.S. Werner Roost; 1 August 1944 – 4 February 1945; Oblt.z.S. Hellmut Rehren; 5 February – 9 May 1945
- Operations: None
- Victories: None

German submarine U-926 was a Type VIIC U-boat of Nazi Germany's Kriegsmarine during World War II.

She was ordered on 25 August 1941, and was laid down on 1 July 1942 at Neptun Werft AG, Rostock, as yard number 513. She was launched on 28 December 1943 and commissioned under the command of Oberleutnant zur See Eberhard von Wenden on 29 February 1944.

== Design ==
German Type VIIC submarines were preceded by the shorter Type VIIB submarines. U-926 had a displacement of 769 tonnes (757 long tons) when at the surface and 871 tonnes (857 long tons) while submerged. She had a total length of 67.10 m (220 ft 2 in), a pressure hull length of 50.50 m (165 ft 8 in), a beam of 6.20 m (20 ft 4 in), a height of 9.60 m (31 ft 6 in), and a draught of 4.74 m (15 ft 7 in). The submarine was powered by two Germaniawerft F46 four-stroke, six-cylinder supercharged diesel engines producing a total of 2,800 to 3,200 metric horsepower (2,060 to 2,350 kW; 2,760 to 3,160 shp) for use while surfaced, two SSW GU 343/38-8 double-acting electric motors producing a total of 750 metric horsepower (550 kW; 740 shp) for use while submerged. She had two shafts and two 1.23 m (4 ft) propellers. The boat was capable of operating at depths of up to 230 metres (750 ft).

The submarine had a maximum surface speed of 17.7 knots (32.8 km/h; 20.4 mph) and a maximum submerged speed of 7.6 knots (14.1 km/h; 8.7 mph). When submerged, the boat could operate for 80 nautical miles (150 km; 92 mi) at 4 knots (7.4 km/h; 4.6 mph); when surfaced, she could travel 8,500 nautical miles (15,700 km; 9,800 mi) at 10 knots (19 km/h; 12 mph). U-926 was fitted with five 53.3 cm (21 in) torpedo tubes (four fitted at the bow and one at the stern), fourteen torpedoes or 26 TMA mines, one 8.8 cm (3.46 in) SK C/35 naval gun, (220 rounds), one 3.7 cm (1.5 in) Flak M42 and two twin 2 cm (0.79 in) C/30 anti-aircraft guns. The boat had a complement of between 44 — 52 men.

== Service history ==
On 9 May 1945, U-926 surrendered at Bergen. Later deemed unseaworthy, she was not transferred to the UK for disposal. U-926 was taken over by the Royal Norwegian Navy and renamed HNoMS Kya on 10 January 1949. She served until 1962 and was scrapped in 1964.

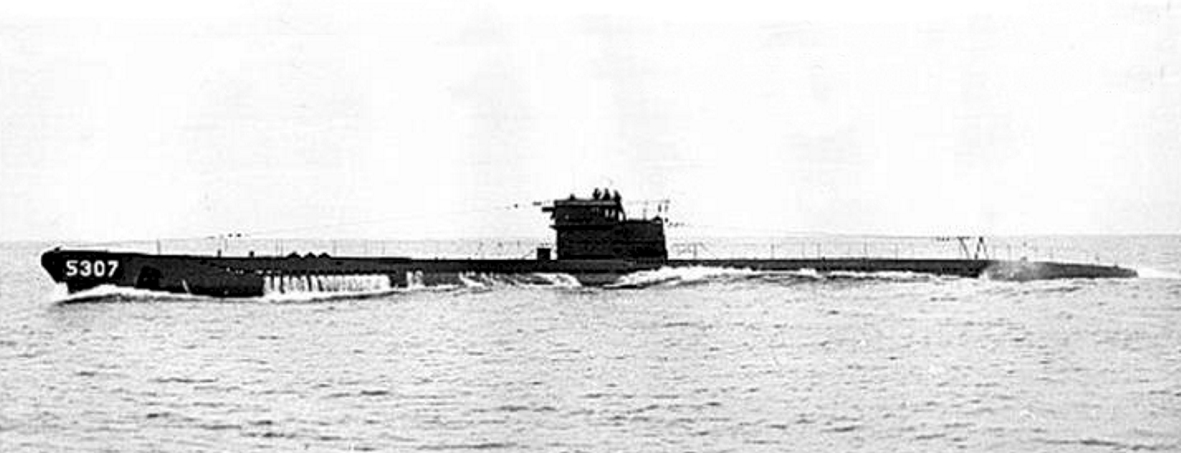
HNoMS Kya (S307) underway circa 1960

== Bibliography ==
- Busch, Rainer; Röll, Hans-Joachim (1999). German U-boat commanders of World War II : a biographical dictionary. Translated by Brooks, Geoffrey. London, Annapolis, Md: Greenhill Books, Naval Institute Press. ISBN 1-55750-186-6.
- Busch, Rainer; Röll, Hans-Joachim (1999). Der U-Boot-Krieg, 1939-1945: Deutsche U-Boot-Verluste von September 1939 bis Mai 1945 [German U-boat losses from September 1939 to May 1945] (in German). Vol. IV. Hamburg, Berlin, Bonn: Mittler. ISBN 3-8132-0514-2.
- Gröner, Eric; Jung, Dieter; Maass, Martin (1991). German Warships 1815-1945: U-boats and Mine Warfare Vessels. Vol. 2. Translated by Thomas, Keith; Magowan, Rachel. London: Conway Maritime Press. ISBN 0-85177-593-4.
