= German submarine U-872 =

German World War II submarine

History

Nazi Germany
- Name: U-872
- Ordered: 25 August 1941
- Builder: DeSchiMAG AG Weser, Bremen
- Yard number: 1080
- Laid down: 23 December 1942
- Launched: 20 October 1943
- Commissioned: 10 February 1944
- Decommissioned: 10 August 1944
- Fate: Badly damaged on 29 July 1944 and scrapped

General characteristics
- Class & type: Type IXD2 submarine
- Displacement: 1,610 t (1,580 long tons) surfaced; 1,799 t (1,771 long tons) submerged
- Length: 87.58 m (287 ft 4 in) o/a; 68.50 m (224 ft 9 in) pressure hull
- Beam: 7.50 m (24 ft 7 in) o/a; 4.40 m (14 ft 5 in) pressure hull
- Height: 10.20 m (33 ft 6 in)
- Draught: 5.35 m (17 ft 7 in)
- Installed power: 9,000 PS (6,620 kW; 8,880 bhp) (diesels); 1,000 PS (740 kW; 990 shp) (electric)
- Propulsion: 2 shafts; 2 × diesel engines; 2 × electric motors
- Speed: 20.8 knots (38.5 km/h; 23.9 mph) surfaced; 6.9 knots (12.8 km/h; 7.9 mph) submerged
- Range: 12,750 nmi (23,610 km; 14,670 mi) at 10 knots (19 km/h; 12 mph) surfaced; 57 nmi (106 km; 66 mi) at 4 knots (7.4 km/h; 4.6 mph) submerged
- Test depth: 230 m (750 ft)
- Complement: 66
- Armament: 6 × 53.3 cm (21 in) torpedo tubes (four bow, two stern); 24 × torpedoes or 48 TMA or 72 TMB naval mines; 1 × 3.7 cm (1.5 in) Flak M42 AA gun; 2 × twin 2 cm (0.79 in) C/30 anti-aircraft guns

Service record
- Part of: 4th U-boat Flotilla; 10 February – 10 August 1944
- Identification codes: M 50 158
- Commanders: Oblt.z.S. / Kptlt. Peter-Otmar Grau; 10 February – 29 July 1944
- Operations: None
- Victories: None

German submarine U-872 was a long-range Type IXD2 U-boat built for Nazi Germany's Kriegsmarine during World War II.

She was ordered on 25 August 1941, and was laid down on 23 December 1942 at DeSchiMAG AG Weser, Bremen, as yard number 1080. She was launched on 20 October 1943 and commissioned under the command of Oberleutnant zur See Peter-Otmar Grau on 10 February 1944.

== Design ==
German Type IXD2 submarines were considerably larger than the original Type IXs. U-872 had a displacement of 1,610 tonnes (1,580 long tons) when at the surface and 1,799 tonnes (1,771 long tons) while submerged. The U-boat had a total length of 87.58 m (287 ft 4 in), a pressure hull length of 68.50 m (224 ft 9 in), a beam of 7.50 m (24 ft 7 in), a height of 10.20 m (33 ft 6 in), and a draught of 5.35 m (17 ft 7 in). The submarine was powered by two MAN M 9 V 40/46 supercharged four-stroke, nine-cylinder diesel engines plus two MWM RS34.5S six-cylinder four-stroke diesel engines for cruising, producing a total of 9,000 metric horsepower (6,620 kW; 8,880 shp) for use while surfaced, two Siemens-Schuckert 2 GU 345/34 double-acting electric motors producing a total of 1,000 shaft horsepower (1,010 PS; 750 kW) for use while submerged. She had two shafts and two 1.85 m (6 ft) propellers. The boat was capable of operating at depths of up to 200 metres (660 ft).

The submarine had a maximum surface speed of 20.8 knots (38.5 km/h; 23.9 mph) and a maximum submerged speed of 6.9 knots (12.8 km/h; 7.9 mph). When submerged, the boat could operate for 121 nautical miles (224 km; 139 mi) at 2 knots (3.7 km/h; 2.3 mph); when surfaced, she could travel 12,750 nautical miles (23,610 km; 14,670 mi) at 10 knots (19 km/h; 12 mph). U-872 was fitted with six 53.3 cm (21 in) torpedo tubes (four fitted at the bow and two at the stern), 24 torpedoes, and a 3.7 cm (1.5 in) Flak M42 with 2575 rounds as well as two twin 2 cm (0.79 in) C/30 anti-aircraft guns with 8100 rounds. The boat had a complement of fifty-five.

== Service history ==
On 29 July 1944, U-872 was badly damaged by bombs at Bremen in a USAAF raid. She was taken out of service on 10 August 1944 and broken up.

== Bibliography ==
- Busch, Rainer; Röll, Hans-Joachim (1997). Der U-Boot-Krieg, 1939-1945: Der U-Boot Bau auf deutschen Werften (in German). Vol. II. Hamburg, Berlin, Bonn: Mittler. ISBN 3-8132-0509-6.
- Busch, Rainer; Röll, Hans-Joachim (1999). German U-boat commanders of World War II : a biographical dictionary. Translated by Brooks, Geoffrey. London, Annapolis, Md: Greenhill Books, Naval Institute Press. ISBN 1-55750-186-6.
- Busch, Rainer; Röll, Hans-Joachim (1999). Der U-Boot-Krieg, 1939-1945: Deutsche U-Boot-Verluste von September 1939 bis Mai 1945 [German U-boat losses from September 1939 to May 1945] (in German). Vol. IV. Hamburg, Berlin, Bonn: Mittler. ISBN 3-8132-0514-2.
- Gröner, Eric; Jung, Dieter; Maass, Martin (1991). German Warships 1815-1945: U-boats and Mine Warfare Vessels. Vol. 2. Translated by Thomas, Keith; Magowan, Rachel. London: Conway Maritime Press. ISBN 0-85177-593-4.
- Sharpe, Peter (1998). U-Boat Fact File, 1935-1945. Great Britain: Midland Publishing. ISBN 1-85780-072-9.
