= 4th U-boat Flotilla =

- Active: Raised 1941, Dissolved 1945
- Country: Nazi Germany
- Branch: Kriegsmarine
- Type: U-boat flotilla
- Garrison/HQ: Stettin

Commanders
- Notable commanders: Kapitänleutnant Werner Jacobsen (May 1941 – June 1942); Kapitänleutnant Fritz Frauenheim (July 1942); Fregattenkapitän Heinz Fischer (August 1942 – May 1945)

The 4th U-boat Flotilla (German 4. Unterseebootsflottille) was formed in May 1941 in Stettin under the command of Kapitänleutnant Werner Jacobsen. Nearly 300 boats received their basic training here. It was disbanded in May 1945.

== Commanders ==
Duration	Rank	Commander
May 1941 - June 1942	Kapitänleutnant	Werner Jacobsen
July 1942 - July 1942	Kapitänleutnant	Fritz Frauenheim
August 1942 - May 1945	Fregattenkapitän	Heinz Fischer

== U-boats ==
U-37	U-38	U-78	U-118	U-119	U-129	U-130
U-131	U-153	U-154	U-155	U-156	U-157	U-158
U-159	U-160	U-161	U-162	U-163	U-164	U-165
U-166	U-167	U-168	U-169	U-170	U-171	U-172
U-173	U-174	U-175	U-176	U-177	U-178	U-179
U-180	U-181	U-182	U-183	U-184	U-185	U-186
U-187	U-188	U-189	U-190	U-191	U-192	U-193
U-194	U-195	U-196	U-197	U-198	U-199	U-200
U-219	U-220	U-233	U-290	U-317	U-318	U-319
U-320	U-321	U-322	U-323	U-324	U-325	U-326
U-327	U-328	U-351	U-370	U-459	U-460	U-461
U-462	U-463	U-464	U-475	U-487	U-488	U-489
U-490	U-504	U-505	U-506	U-507	U-508	U-509
U-510	U-511	U-512	U-513	U-514	U-515	U-516
U-517	U-518	U-519	U-520	U-521	U-522	U-523
U-524	U-525	U-526	U-527	U-528	U-529	U-530
U-531	U-532	U-533	U-534	U-535	U-536	U-537
U-538	U-539	U-540	U-541	U-542	U-543	U-544
U-545	U-546	U-547	U-548	U-549	U-550	U-579
U-676	U-801	U-802	U-803	U-804	U-805	U-806
U-821	U-822	U-841	U-842	U-843	U-844	U-845
U-846	U-847	U-848	U-849	U-850	U-851	U-852
U-853	U-854	U-855	U-856	U-857	U-858	U-859
U-860	U-861	U-862	U-863	U-864	U-865	U-866
U-867	U-868	U-869	U-870	U-871	U-872	U-873
U-874	U-875	U-876	U-877	U-878	U-879	U-880
U-881	U-883	U-889	U-901	U-925	U-926	U-927
U-928	U-929	U-930	U-1025	U-1221	U-1222	U-1223
U-1234	U-1301	U-1302	U-1303	U-1304	U-1305	U-1306
U-1307	U-1308	U-2321	U-2322	U-2323	U-2324	U-2325
U-2326	U-2336	U-2339	U-2343	U-2346	U-2347	U-2348
U-2349	U-2350	U-2351	U-2352	U-2353	U-2354	U-2355
U-2356	U-2357	U-2358	U-2359	U-2360	U-2361	U-2362
U-2363	U-2364	U-2365	U-2366	U-2367	U-2368	U-2369
U-2371	U-3001	U-3002	U-3003	U-3004	U-3005	U-3006
U-3007	U-3008	U-3009	U-3010	U-3011	U-3012	U-3013
U-3014	U-3015	U-3016	U-3017	U-3018	U-3019	U-3020
U-3021	U-3022	U-3023	U-3024	U-3025	U-3026	U-3027
U-3028	U-3029	U-3030	U-3031	U-3032	U-3033	U-3034
U-3035	U-3037	U-3038	U-3039	U-3040	U-3041	U-3044
