= Flender Werke =

Flender Werke AG
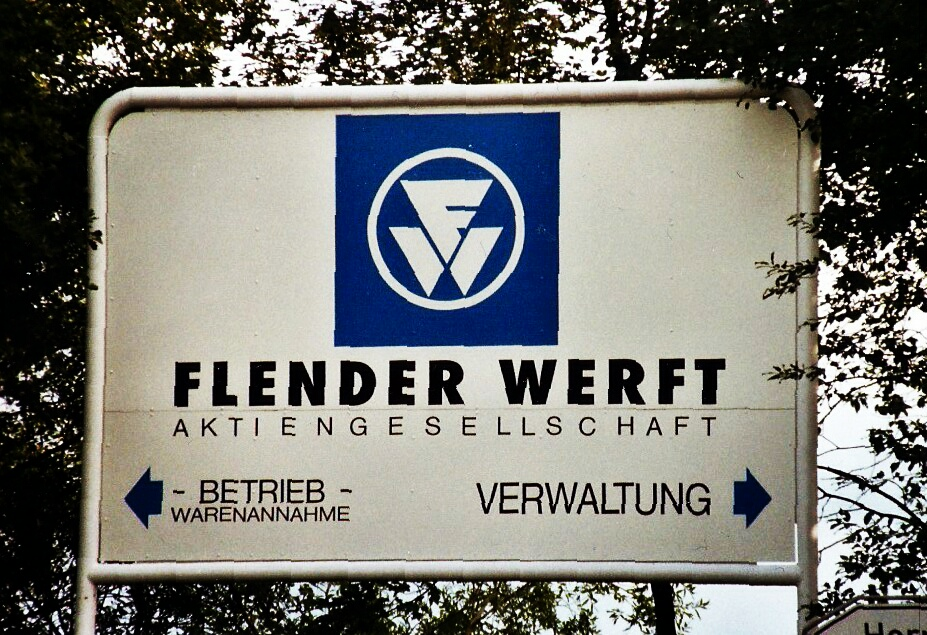
- Industry: Shipbuilding
- Founded: 1917
- Defunct: 2002
- Fate: Bankrupt
- Headquarters: Lübeck, Germany
- Products: Merchant ships Warships; U-boats
- Number of employees: ~4,000

Flender Werke was a German shipbuilding company, located in Lübeck. It was founded in 1917 as a branch of Brückenbau Flender AG of Benrath on the Rhine. In 1926, it became a fully independent business and was renamed Lübecker Flenderwerke AG. It went on to become one of the largest shipyards in Germany, building nearly 700 ships in all.

== History ==
During World War II, Flender Werke built 2 Type II and 40 Type VII U-boats for the Kriegsmarine.

After the war, Flender Werke continued to build merchant ships, and in 1973 it was renamed Flender Werft AG. In 2002, it was forced to close because of insolvency.
