= German submarine U-873 =

German World War II submarine

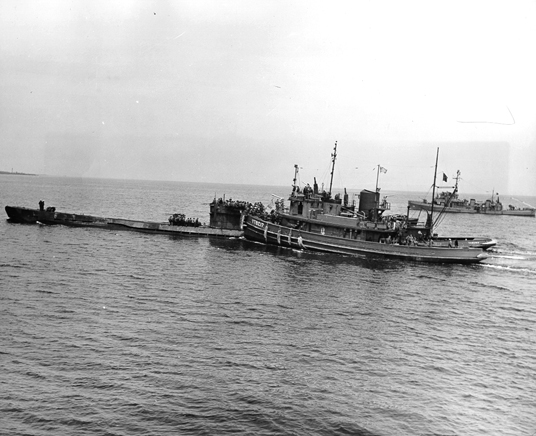
- The U.S. Coast Guard patrol boat USCGC Argo (WPC-100) and a tug escort the surrendered German Type IXD2 submarine U-873 to the Portsmouth Naval Shipyard on Seavey's Island in Kittery, Maine, bordering Portsmouth, New Hampshire (USA) on 16 May 1945.

History

Nazi Germany
- Name: U-873
- Ordered: 25 August 1941
- Builder: AG Weser, Bremen
- Yard number: 1081
- Laid down: 17 February 1943
- Launched: 11 November 1943
- Commissioned: 1 March 1944
- Fate: Surrendered on 16 May 1945; Scrapped in March 1948

General characteristics
- Class & type: Type IXD2 submarine
- Displacement: 1,610 t (1,580 long tons) surfaced; 1,799 t (1,771 long tons) submerged
- Length: 87.58 m (287 ft 4 in) o/a; 68.50 m (224 ft 9 in) pressure hull
- Beam: 7.50 m (24 ft 7 in) o/a; 4.40 m (14 ft 5 in) pressure hull
- Height: 10.20 m (33 ft 6 in)
- Draught: 5.35 m (17 ft 7 in)
- Installed power: 9,000 PS (6,620 kW; 8,880 bhp) (diesels); 1,000 PS (740 kW; 990 shp) (electric)
- Propulsion: 2 shafts; 2 × diesel engines; 2 × electric motors
- Speed: 20.8 knots (38.5 km/h; 23.9 mph) urfaced; 7 knots (13 km/h; 8.1 mph) submerged
- Range: 23,700 nmi (43,900 km; 27,300 mi) at 10 knots (19 km/h; 12 mph) surfaced; 57 nmi (106 km; 66 mi) at 4 knots (7.4 km/h; 4.6 mph) submerged
- Test depth: Calculated crush depth: 250 m (820 ft)
- Boats & landing craft carried: 2 dinghies
- Complement: 55 - 64
- Armament: 6 × bow torpedo tubes (four bow, two stern); 24 × torpedoes; 1 × 3.7 cm (1.5 in) Flak M42 AA gun; 2 × twin 2 cm (0.79 in) C/30 anti-aircraft guns

Service record
- Part of: 4th U-boat Flotilla; 1 March 1944 – 31 January 1945; 33rd U-boat Flotilla; 1 February – 8 May 1945
- Identification codes: M 50 271
- Commanders: Kptlt. Friedrich Steinhoff; 1 March 1944 – 16 May 1945
- Operations: 1 patrol: 30 March – 16 May 1945
- Victories: None

German submarine U-873 was a German long-range Type IXD2 U-boat of World War II. Following the surrender of Germany, the United States Navy studied U-873 to improve United States submarine designs. U-873 is remembered for the controversial treatment of its crew as prisoners of war and the death of commanding officer Kapitänleutnant Friedrich Steinhoff in a Boston jail cell. Six months after Steinhoff's death, his brother was one of the Operation Paperclip rocket scientists from Peenemünde arriving in the United States to work at White Sands Missile Range.

== Design ==
German Type IXD2 submarines were considerably larger than the original Type IXs. U-873 had a displacement of 1,610 tonnes (1,580 long tons) when at the surface and 1,799 tonnes (1,771 long tons) while submerged. The U-boat had a total length of 87.58 m (287 ft 4 in), a pressure hull length of 68.50 m (224 ft 9 in), a beam of 7.50 m (24 ft 7 in), a height of 10.20 m (33 ft 6 in), and a draught of 5.35 m (17 ft 7 in). The submarine was powered by two MAN M 9 V 40/46 supercharged four-stroke, nine-cylinder diesel engines plus two MWM RS34.5S six-cylinder four-stroke diesel engines for cruising, producing a total of 9,000 metric horsepower (6,620 kW; 8,880 shp) for use while surfaced, two Siemens-Schuckert 2 GU 345/34 double-acting electric motors producing a total of 1,000 metric horsepower (740 kW; 990 shp) for use while submerged. She had two shafts and two 1.85 m (6 ft) propellers. The boat was capable of operating at depths of up to 200 metres (660 ft).

The submarine had a maximum surface speed of 20.8 knots (38.5 km/h; 23.9 mph) and a maximum submerged speed of 6.9 knots (12.8 km/h; 7.9 mph). When submerged, the boat could operate for 121 nautical miles (224 km; 139 mi) at 2 knots (3.7 km/h; 2.3 mph); when surfaced, she could travel 23,700 nautical miles (43,900 km; 27,300 mi) at 10 knots (19 km/h; 12 mph). U-873 was fitted with six 53.3 cm (21 in) torpedo tubes (four fitted at the bow and two at the stern), 24 torpedoes, and a 3.7 cm (1.5 in) Flak M42 with 2575 rounds as well as two 2 cm (0.79 in) C/30 anti-aircraft guns with 8100 rounds. The boat had a complement of fifty-five.

== Service history ==
U-873 was commissioned on 1 March 1944 under the command of Kapitänleutnant Friedrich Steinhoff and assigned to the 4th U-boat Flotilla for training in the Baltic Sea from the base in Stettin. The crew of the new submarine was assembled around a nucleus of Engineering Officer Helmut Jürgens, Quartermaster Albert Finister, and ten other survivors from U-604, which had been sunk off the coast of Brazil on 11 August 1943. On 29 July 1944 a small aerial bomb struck the control room of U-873 during a bombing raid on Bremen, injuring three and killing crewman Fritz Grusa. U-873 completed repairs in November. A Deschimag Type I schnorchel was fitted in December.

Upon completion of training on 31 January 1945 U-873 was assigned to the 33rd U-boat Flotilla at Flensburg for war patrols to the Atlantic Ocean. U-873 departed from Kiel on 17 February 1945 and arrived in Horten Naval Base on 22 February. U-873 sailed from Horten on 21 March 1945 and reached Kristiansand the following day. U-873 sailed from Kristiansand on 30 March 1945 and was proceeding to an assigned operations area in the Caribbean Sea when Germany surrendered on 8 May. At 04:30 GMT on 11 May, U-873 surrendered to USS Vance of Escort Division 45 (CortDiv 45) while it was escorting convoy UGS 90 at 35°45′N 42°31′W. Vance placed a prize crew aboard U-873 and escorted the U-boat to Portsmouth Naval Shipyard on 16 May. U-873 was placed in dry dock for a design study of the Type IXD2 class of U-boats by Portsmouth Naval Shipyard engineers; and was later transferred to the Philadelphia Naval Shipyard. Following completion of trials, the U-boat was scrapped in 1948.

== Portsmouth ==
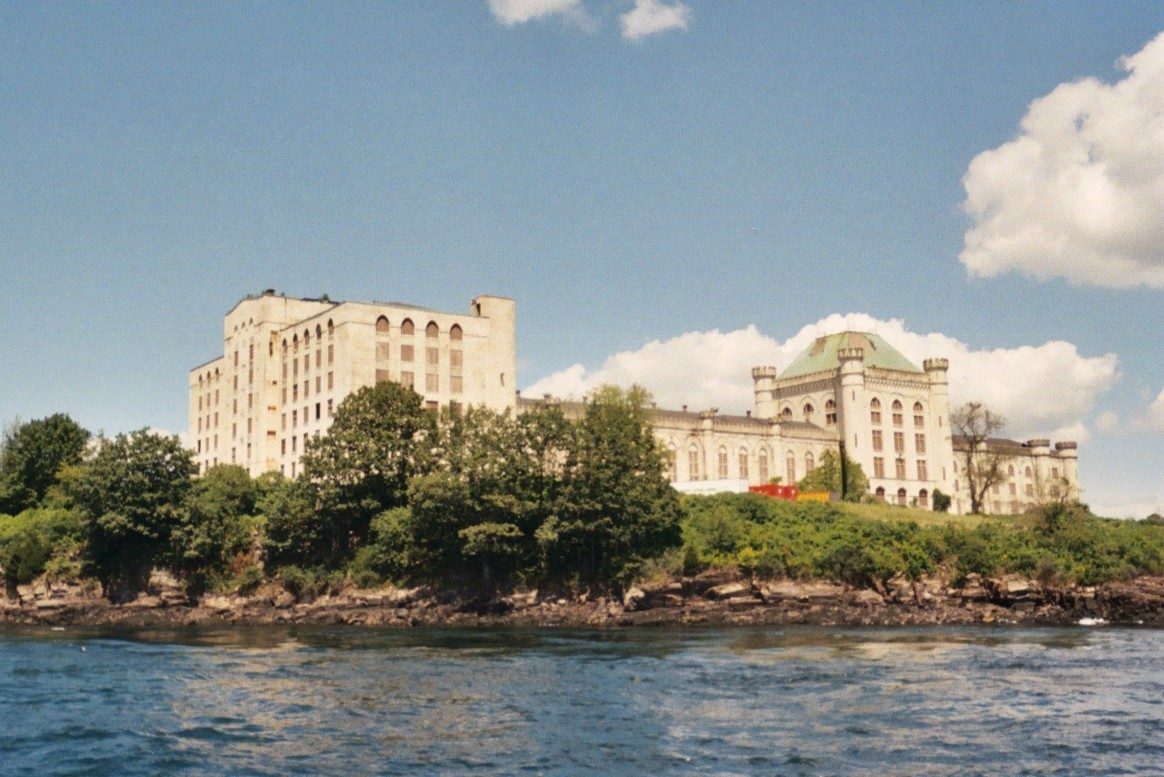
Portsmouth Naval Prison

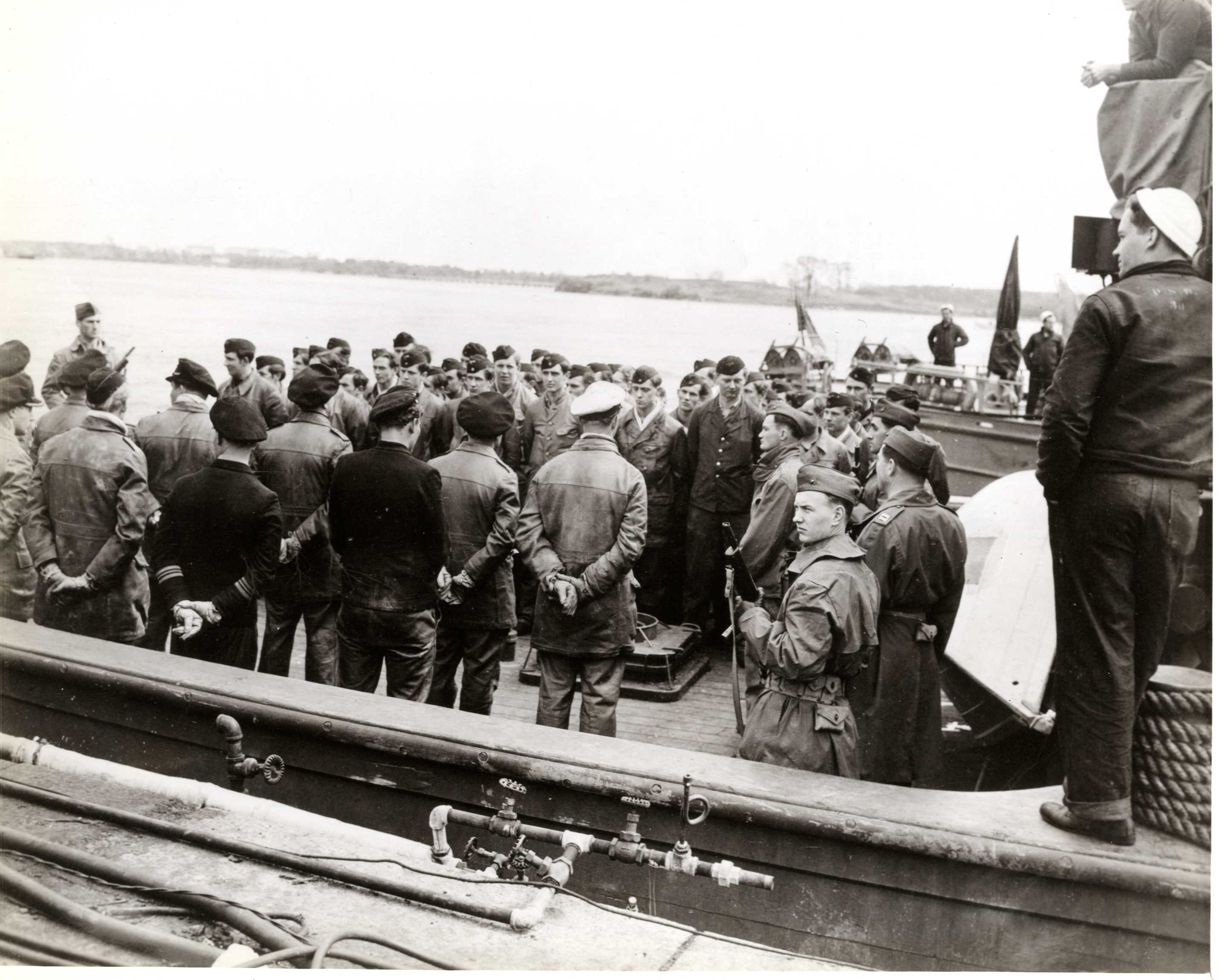
German Prisoners from U-873 at the Portsmouth Navy Yard in New Hampshire in May 1945

German Type IX submarine U-805 had arrived at Portsmouth the day before U-873 arrived, and U-1228 arrived the following day. The German Type X submarine U-234 arrived on 19 May. Possessions of the crews of these U-boats had been scattered by the prize crews in the process of searching for intelligence information and evidence of sabotage. Upon arrival at Portsmouth the U-boat crews were sent to Portsmouth Naval Prison for interrogation by the Office of Naval Intelligence (ONI). Subsequent investigation concluded personal possessions of the U-boat crewmen were looted contrary to provisions of the Geneva Convention.

Following interrogation at Portsmouth Naval Prison, the handcuffed crew of U-873 was pelted with insults, stones and garbage by incited onlookers from the roadside while deliberately being marched through the streets of Boston to the Suffolk County Charles Street Jail to await transfer to a prisoner-of-war camp in Mississippi.

== Commanding Officer ==
Friedrich Steinhoff was born in Küllstedt on 14 July 1909 and was a merchant marine officer prior to joining Kriegsmarine crew 34. After serving with the 4th minesweeping flotilla from December 1939 to May 1940, he was a watch officer aboard U-96 from July through October 1941. He then commanded U-511 during rocket launching experiments of 1942 in cooperation with his brother Ernst Steinhoff, who was Director for Flight Mechanics, Ballistics, Guidance Control, and Instrumentation at the Peenemünde Army Research Center. Command of U-873 was preceded by a year of staff duty with the 7th U-boat Flotilla.

U-873 crewman Georg Seitz reported Steinhoff's face was bleeding and swollen when he returned to his cell after being questioned by a civilian ONI interrogator who ordered a husky United States Marine Corps guard to slap the officer. On 19 May 1945 Steinhoff bled to death in his Boston jail cell from wrist wounds, possibly inflicted with the broken lens of his sunglasses. He was buried in grave 934 at Fort Devens.

== Armament ==
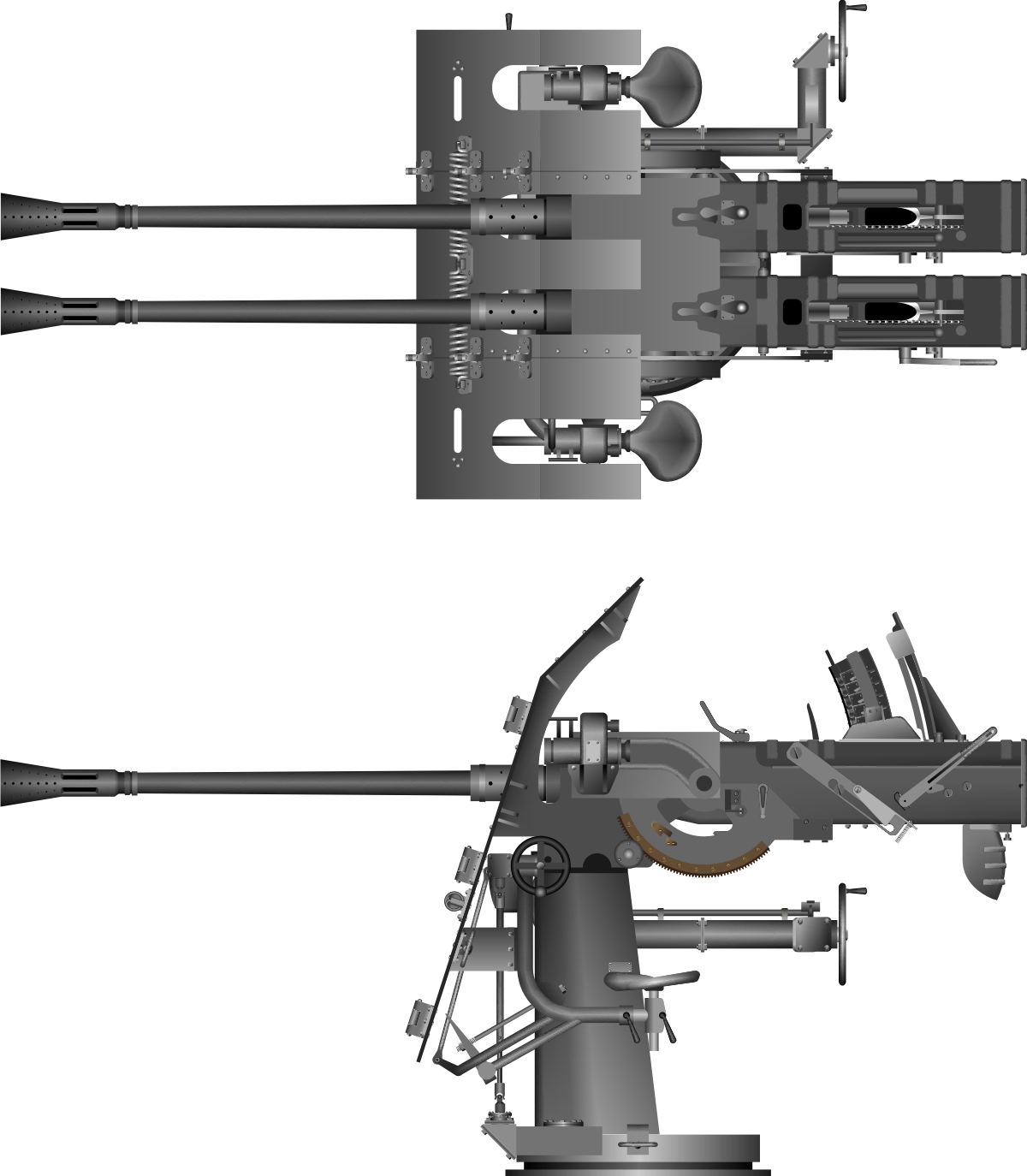
Twin 3.7 cm Flak M42U guns on the DLM 42U mount

=== Flak weaponry ===
U-873 was mounted with the rare twin 3.7 cm Flakzwilling M43U on the DLM42 mount. This was one of the Kriegsmarine's best AA weapons of World War II. The DLM42 mount was mainly used on the Type IX as it was rather heavy for the Type VII U-boats. The 3.7 cm Flak M42U was the naval version of the 3.7 cm Flak used by the Kriegsmarine on Type VII and Type IX U-boats.

== Bibliography ==
- Busch, Rainer; Röll, Hans-Joachim (1999). German U-boat commanders of World War II : a biographical dictionary. Translated by Brooks, Geoffrey. London, Annapolis, Md: Greenhill Books, Naval Institute Press. ISBN 1-55750-186-6.
- Gröner, Eric; Jung, Dieter; Maass, Martin (1991). German Warships 1815-1945: U-boats and Mine Warfare Vessels. Vol. 2. Translated by Thomas, Keith; Magowan, Rachel. London: Conway Maritime Press. ISBN 0-85177-593-4.
- Paterson, Lawrence Black Flag: The Surrender of Germany's U-Boat Forces MBI Publishing (2009) ISBN 0760337543
- Taylor, J.C. German Warships of World War II Doubleday & Company (1967)
