= Portsmouth Naval Prison =

Former U.S. Navy and Marine Corps prison in Kittery, ME

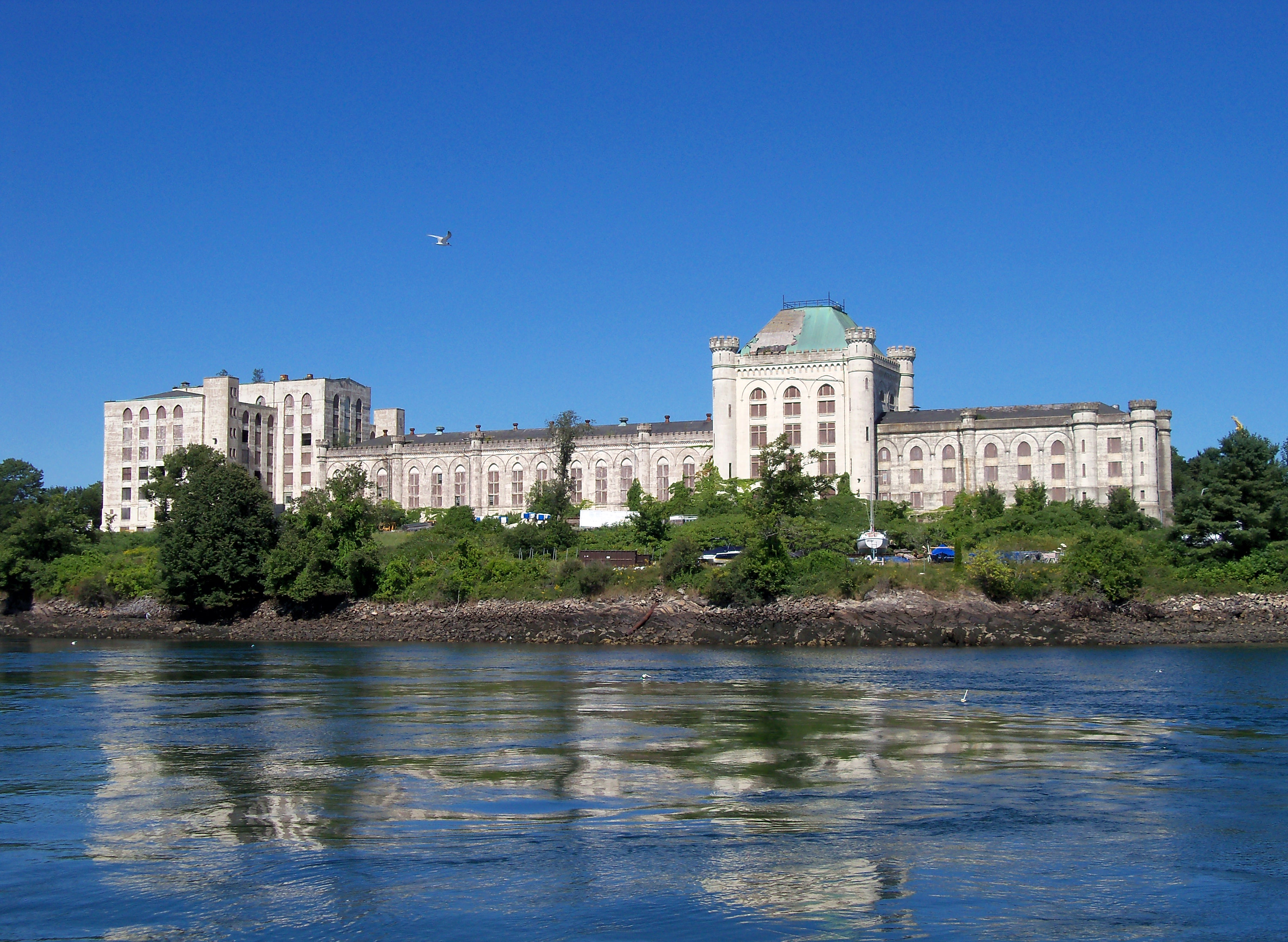
- The former prison as seen in 2013

- Location within Maine Location within the United States
- Location: Kittery, Maine; 43°04′34″N 70°43′52″W
- Status: Closed
- Opened: 1908
- Closed: 1974

Portsmouth Naval Prison is a former U.S. Navy and Marine Corps prison on the grounds of the Portsmouth Naval Shipyard (PNS) in Kittery, Maine. Occupied during 1908–1974, its reinforced concrete building resembles a castle.

== Fort Sullivan and Camp Long ==
The island site was first used in 1775 during the Revolution when the New Hampshire militia, commanded by General John Sullivan, constructed an earthwork defense called Fort Sullivan atop the bluff. In conjunction with Fort Washington across the Piscataqua River on Peirce Island, it guarded the channel to Portsmouth. Eliphalet Daniels served as a commander in 1776. The militia withdrew about three years later.

The fort was reactivated for the War of 1812 in 1814. In 1861, it was rebuilt with eleven 8-inch Rodman guns to protect Portsmouth against attacks by the Confederate navy. After 1866, Fort Sullivan was dismantled. Camp Long, named for Secretary of the Navy John Long, was erected nearby during the Spanish–American War. From 11 July to mid-September in 1898, the stockade housed 1,612 Spanish prisoners, including Admiral Pascual Cervera, until returned to Spain.

== "Alcatraz of the East" ==
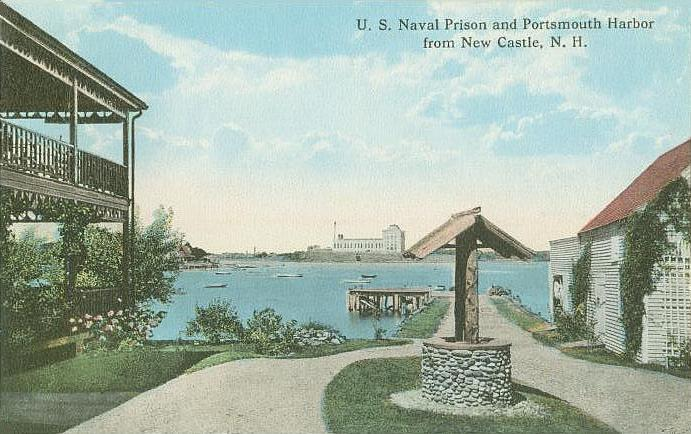
Prison from across river, c. 1913

When Camp Long was dismantled in 1901, the site became available for a naval prison. Constructed between 1905 and 1908, the brig was modeled after the Fort Alcatraz military prison on Alcatraz Island with tidal currents to deter escape. Colonel Allan C. Kelton of the Marine Corps was in command when the first Navy prisoners arrived in 1908. It would eventually house Marine inmates as well. The central crenellated tower, roofed in copper, was erected in 1912. Lieutenant Commander Thomas Mott Osborne assumed command in 1917. Called "the Father of Naval Corrections," Osborne and two others went undercover in the prison to see what changes needed to be made, including living conditions. During World War I, the prison housed wartime convicts—among them Victor Folke Nelson—reaching a maximum of 2,295 in 1918. By 1921 President Warren G. Harding had appointed a new Secretary of the Navy, who promptly ended Osborne's Mutual Welfare League program for prisoners at Portsmouth.

Two wings were eventually added to the prison—in 1942 the northeast wing, and in 1943 the unornamented southwest wing, dubbed "the Fortress," which rises sheer beside the rocky shore. Maximum occupancy reached 3,088 in 1945. In the decade before the United States' entry into World War II, around 40% of all new prisoners arriving at Portsmouth were there on charges related to sodomy or other similar crimes of a sexual nature not relating to women. The overabundance of prisoners convicted of homosexual activity at Portsmouth contributed to changes in policy towards homosexual sailors during World War II.

== Office of Naval Intelligence ==
After the German surrender ended World War II fighting in Europe on 5 May 1945, U-boats surrendering to United States naval forces were escorted to Portsmouth so engineers at the Portsmouth Naval Shipyard might study their design features. U-805, U-873, U-1228 and U-234 were towed to the Portsmouth Naval Shipyard between 15 and 19 May. The Office of Naval Intelligence (ONI) had interrogators available to question the submarine crewmen at the prison. The interrogations were classified at the time because of potential military value of information collected about German submarine, jet aircraft, ballistic missile, guided bomb, and nuclear weapons technology. U-234 had been bound for Japan carrying 1,232 lb (559 kg) of uranium oxide, a disassembled Messerschmitt Me 262 jet fighter, tons of prototypes and technical documents relating to new weapons, and several senior weapons technicians. The commanding officer of U-873 had conducted submarine-launched ballistic missile experiments with his brother Ernst Steinhoff, who was Director for Flight Mechanics, Ballistics, Guidance Control, and Instrumentation at the Peenemünde Army Research Center. Kapitänleutnant Friedrich Steinhoff was slapped by a large, husky Marine guard until his face was swollen and bleeding, and died in a Charles Street Jail cell after two days of interrogation. Despite subsequent declassification of documents, it is unclear if ONI realized Steinhoff's ballistic missile connections. Similar uncertainty remains about disposal of the uranium oxide aboard U-234.

There was inadequate preparation to deal with the arriving U-boats. United States Navy prize crews scattered possessions of the U-boat crewmen as they searched for potential sabotage and intelligence information while the U-boats were en route to Portsmouth. Scattered documents and clothing were perceived as fire and access hazards while the U-boats awaited inspection by shipyard engineers. Material scattered aboard the U-boats was stockpiled in the prison entrance lobby where it was looted by prison guards. Decorations and personal possessions taken from U-boat crewmen were retained as souvenirs rather than returned to prisoners of war as required by the Geneva Conventions.

== Cold War ==
The brig was used throughout the Korean War and almost to the end of the Vietnam War. During warmer months, it was not uncommon for boats navigating the river to hear shouts and whistles coming from within barred windows of "the Fortress." In 1974 the Department of Defense developed a three-tiered, regional correctional facility plan. Inmates would be placed depending on the service, sentence length, geographical location, and treatment programs. First-tier offenders are those with sentences less than a year, second-tier up to seven years. Male convicts from all the services sentenced to punitive discharge and incarceration longer than seven years are confined at the third tier—the maximum-security U.S. Disciplinary Barracks at Fort Leavenworth, Kansas. The Portsmouth Naval Prison, built to be a modern correctional facility for a navy which had once disciplined by flogging and capital punishment, was rendered obsolete. After containing about 86,000 military inmates over its 66-year operation, the brig closed in 1974, its maintenance thereafter contributing to shipyard overhead. The Navy briefly used the prison in the early 1980s to train military corrections officers. Volunteer inmates from the Rockingham County Jail were sometimes used.

== In popular culture ==
In the 1973 movie The Last Detail, seaman Larry Meadows (Randy Quaid) is escorted by petty officers Billy "Badass" Buddusky (Jack Nicholson) and Mule Mulhall (Otis Young) to the Portsmouth Naval Prison. Meadows has been sentenced to eight years' confinement for trying to steal $40 from a charity box. But because of his harsh sentence, the guards feel sorry for Meadows. They decide to show the naive sailor the time of his life before arriving on Seavey's Island (where another location substitutes for the actual brig).

In W. E. B. Griffin's novel Semper Fi, Corporal Kenneth "Killer" McCoy is assigned to transport prisoners from San Diego to the Portsmouth Naval Prison.

In an episode of the WWII flying drama TV series Baa Baa Black Sheep entitled "The 200 Pound Gorilla", the character of Master Gunnery Sergeant Andrew "Andy" Micklin played by Red West is promoted to Warrant Officer. In order to show his opposition to the promotion, he fights with all of the officers and is thrown in the brig, a Marine Corps jail. He thinks he will just be demoted. But, in fact, they start talking about the fact that he will be "sent to Portsmouth."

The prison is referred to in Stephen King's 1982 novella The Body, later filmed as Stand by Me.

The prison and shipyard locations were used to depict a Russian shipyard in the 1978 television film The Defection of Simas Kudirka starring Alan Arkin.

Protagonist character Joker refers to the shipyard in the 1979 novel The Short-Timers, which was later adapted as the 1987 film Full Metal Jacket, but without the reference.

== Disuse ==
The building was previously one of 14 structures the Portsmouth Naval Shipyard had considered for outleasing and renovation. Local developer Joseph Sawtelle estimated the cost to renovate the immense edifice into civilian office space, including removing lead paint and asbestos, would cost more than $10 million. But plans to adapt the prison were halted a month after Sawtelle's death in 2000, and abandoned altogether after military base security was tightened following the September 11 attacks.

== Notes ==
=== Bibliography ===
- Blair, Clay (1998). Hitler's U-Boat War: The Hunted 1942–1945. Random House. ISBN 0-679-45742-9.
- Paterson, Lawrence (2009). Black Flag: The Surrender of Germany's U-Boat Forces. MBI Publishing. ISBN 978-0760337547.
