= German submarine U-398 =

German World War II submarine

History

Nazi Germany
- Name: U-398
- Ordered: 20 January 1941
- Builder: Howaldtswerke AG, Kiel
- Yard number: 30
- Laid down: 26 August 1942
- Launched: 6 November 1943
- Commissioned: 18 December 1943
- Fate: Went missing after 17 April 1945 in the North Sea or possibly the Arctic Ocean, position and cause unknown. 43 missing (all hands presumed lost).

General characteristics
- Class & type: Type VIIC submarine
- Displacement: 769 tonnes (757 long tons) surfaced; 871 t (857 long tons) submerged
- Length: 67.10 m (220 ft 2 in) o/a; 50.50 m (165 ft 8 in) pressure hull
- Beam: 6.20 m (20 ft 4 in) o/a; 4.70 m (15 ft 5 in) pressure hull
- Height: 9.60 m (31 ft 6 in)
- Draught: 4.74 m (15 ft 7 in)
- Installed power: 2,800–3,200 PS (2,100–2,400 kW; 2,800–3,200 bhp) (diesels); 750 PS (550 kW; 740 shp) (electric)
- Propulsion: 2 shafts; 2 × diesel engines; 2 × electric motors
- Speed: 17.7 knots (32.8 km/h; 20.4 mph) surfaced; 7.6 knots (14.1 km/h; 8.7 mph) submerged
- Range: 8,500 nmi (15,700 km; 9,800 mi) at 10 knots (19 km/h; 12 mph) surfaced; 80 nmi (150 km; 92 mi) at 4 knots (7.4 km/h; 4.6 mph) submerged
- Test depth: 230 m (750 ft); Crush depth: 250–295 m (820–968 ft)
- Complement: 4 officers, 40–56 enlisted
- Armament: 5 × 53.3 cm (21 in) torpedo tubes (four bow, one stern); 14 × torpedoes; 1 × 3.7 cm (1.5 in) Flak M42 AA gun; 2 × twin 2 cm (0.79 in) C/30 anti-aircraft guns

Service record
- Part of: 5th U-boat Flotilla; 18 December 1943 – 31 July 1944; 3rd U-boat Flotilla; 1 August – 31 October 1944; 33rd U-boat Flotilla; 1 November 1944 – 17 April 1945
- Identification codes: M 54 603
- Commanders: K.Kapt. Johann Reckhoff; 18 December 1943 – 8 November 1944; Oblt.z.S. Wilhelm Cranz; 9 November 1944 – 17 April 1945
- Operations: 2 patrols: 1st patrol: a. 23 August – 15 October 1944; b. 19 – 24 October 1944; c. 8 – 16 March 1945; 2nd patrol: 14 – 17 April 1945
- Victories: None

German submarine U-398 was a Type VIIC U-boat built for Nazi Germany's Kriegsmarine for service during World War II. The U-boat was laid down at the Howaldtswerke in Kiel on 26 August 1942, launched on 6 November 1943 and commissioned on 18 December of that same year, under Korvettenkapitän Johan Reckhoff. He was replaced by Oberleutnant zur See Wilhelm Kranz on 8 November 1944.

The boat served initially with the 5th U-boat Flotilla, a training organization, between 18 December 1943 and 31 July 1944, before moving over to the operational 3rd flotilla between 1 August and 31 October 1944 and the 33rd flotilla between 1 November 1944 and her loss.

== Design ==
German Type VIIC submarines were preceded by the shorter Type VIIB submarines. U-398 had a displacement of 769 tonnes (757 long tons) when at the surface and 871 tonnes (857 long tons) while submerged. She had a total length of 67.10 m (220 ft 2 in), a pressure hull length of 50.50 m (165 ft 8 in), a beam of 6.20 m (20 ft 4 in), a height of 9.60 m (31 ft 6 in), and a draught of 4.74 m (15 ft 7 in). The submarine was powered by two Germaniawerft F46 four-stroke, six-cylinder supercharged diesel engines producing a total of 2,800 to 3,200 metric horsepower (2,060 to 2,350 kW; 2,760 to 3,160 shp) for use while surfaced, two Garbe, Lahmeyer & Co. RP 137/c double-acting electric motors producing a total of 750 metric horsepower (550 kW; 740 shp) for use while submerged. She had two shafts and two 1.23 m (4 ft) propellers. The boat was capable of operating at depths of up to 230 metres (750 ft).

The submarine had a maximum surface speed of 17.7 knots (32.8 km/h; 20.4 mph) and a maximum submerged speed of 7.6 knots (14.1 km/h; 8.7 mph). When submerged, the boat could operate for 80 nautical miles (150 km; 92 mi) at 4 knots (7.4 km/h; 4.6 mph); when surfaced, she could travel 8,500 nautical miles (15,700 km; 9,800 mi) at 10 knots (19 km/h; 12 mph). U-398 was fitted with five 53.3 cm (21 in) torpedo tubes (four fitted at the bow and one at the stern), fourteen torpedoes, one 3.7 cm (1.5 in) Flak M42 and two twin 2 cm (0.79 in) C/30 anti-aircraft guns. *The commissioning of an unknown refit to the external shell and restructuring of internal cabin facilities before her final voyage has been rumoured, but German naval records haven't confirmed this. The boat had a complement of between forty-four and sixty.

== Service history ==
U-398 carried out two patrols, the first, commencing on 23 August 1944, took her as far as the west coast of Ireland; starting from Horten Naval Base in Norway and finishing with her arrival in Bergen on 15 October. A total of 54 days were spent at sea. These were uneventful.

Her second patrol ended abruptly after just four days in April 1945. She vanished without trace in either the North Sea or possibly the Arctic Ocean. The cause for her disappearance remains unknown.

== Bibliography ==
- Busch, Rainer; Röll, Hans-Joachim (1999). German U-boat commanders of World War II : a biographical dictionary. Translated by Brooks, Geoffrey. London, Annapolis, Md: Greenhill Books, Naval Institute Press. ISBN 1-55750-186-6.
- Busch, Rainer; Röll, Hans-Joachim (1999). Deutsche U-Boot-Verluste von September 1939 bis Mai 1945 [German U-boat losses from September 1939 to May 1945]. Der U-Boot-Krieg (in German). Vol. IV. Hamburg, Berlin, Bonn: Mittler. ISBN 3-8132-0514-2.
- Gröner, Erich; Jung, Dieter; Maass, Martin (1991). U-boats and Mine Warfare Vessels. German Warships 1815–1945. Vol. 2. Translated by Thomas, Keith; Magowan, Rachel. London: Conway Maritime Press. ISBN 0-85177-593-4.
