= SS Dettifoss =

Icelandic cargo ship (1930–1945)

- SS Dettifoss.

History
- Name: Dettifoss
- Owner: Eimskipafelag Hf.
- Port of registry: (Iceland) Reykjavík
- Builder: Frederikshavns Vaerft & Flydedok A/S
- Launched: 24 July 1930
- Completed: 1930
- Identification: TFDA
- Fate: Torpedoed and sunk 21 February 1945

General characteristics
- Type: Cargo ship
- Tonnage: 1,564 GRT
- Length: 72.2 m (236 ft 11 in)
- Beam: 11 m (36 ft 1 in)
- Depth: 6.4 m (21 ft 0 in)
- Installed power: Compound expansion engine
- Propulsion: Screw propeller
- Speed: 10 knots (19 km/h; 12 mph)
- Capacity: 44 passengers and crew

SS Dettifoss was an Icelandic cargo ship that was torpedoed by the German submarine U-1064 in the Irish Sea 25 nautical miles (46 km) out of Belfast, United Kingdom, while she was travelling from New York, United States, to Belfast, United Kingdom, and later to Reykjavík, Iceland.

== Construction ==
Dettifoss was constructed in 1930 at the Frederikshavns Vaerft & Flydedok A/S shipyard in Frederikshavn, Denmark. The ship was 72.2 metres (236 ft 11 in) long, with a beam of 11 metres (36 ft 1 in) and a depth of 6.4 metres (21 ft 0 in). The ship was assessed at 1,564 gross register tons (GRT). She had a compound expansion engine driving a single screw propeller and the engine was rated at 124 nominal horsepower.

== Sinking ==
On 21 February 1945, Dettifoss was on a voyage in Convoy UR 155 from New York, United States, to Belfast, United Kingdom, and later to Reykjavík, Iceland, with a general cargo of 1,300 tons. When she was torpedoed by the German submarine U-1064 at 08:39 hours in the Irish Sea 25 nautical miles (46 km) out of Belfast. Dettifoss sank within seven minutes resulting in the death of 12 crew members and 3 passengers. The 29 survivors (18 crew and 11 passengers) were picked up an hour after the sinking by HMS Fusilier and were then taken to Scotland and later to Iceland. The sinking of Dettifoss was a harsh blow so soon after the loss of SS Godafoss. All public activities in Iceland were cancelled on 24 February 1945.

== Wreck ==
The wreck lies at 55°03′N 5°29′W.
