= 33rd U-boat Flotilla =

33. Unterseebootsflottille
- Active: September 1944–May 1945
- Country: Nazi Germany
- Branch: Kriegsmarine
- Type: U-boat flotilla
- Garrison/HQ: Flensburg

Commanders
- Notable commanders: Korvkpt. Georg Schewe; Korvkpt. Günter Kuhnke

The 33rd U-boat Flotilla (33. Unterseebootflottille) was a front-line unit of Nazi Germany's Kriegsmarine during World War II.

The flotilla was founded at Flensburg in September 1944 under the command of Korvettenkapitän Georg Schewe, though Korvkpt. Günter Kuhnke took over the command in October 1944.

The flotilla included Unterseeboote (U-boats) that had been based at the French submarine bases captured by the Allied advance during the Normandy Campaign, as well as U-boats operating in the Indian Ocean (the Monsun Gruppe). The flotilla was disbanded in May 1945 after the German surrender.

== Assigned U-boats ==
In all, 76 U-boats were assigned to this flotilla during its service.

- U-155
- U-168
- U-170
- U-181
- U-183
- U-190
- U-195
- U-196
- U-219
- U-234
- U-245
- U-260
- U-262
- U-267
- U-281
- U-309
- U-382
- U-398
- U-510
- U-516
- U-518
- U-530
- U-532
- U-534
- U-537
- U-539
- U-541
- U-546
- U-547
- U-548
- U-714
- U-758
- U-763
- U-802
- U-804
- U-805
- U-806
- U-843
- U-853
- U-857
- U-858
- U-861
- U-862
- U-864
- U-866
- U-868
- U-869
- U-870
- U-873
- U-874
- U-875
- U-877
- U-878
- U-879
- U-880
- U-881
- U-889
- U-953
- U-989
- U-1106
- U-1170
- U-1205
- U-1221
- U-1223
- U-1226
- U-1227
- U-1228
- U-1230
- U-1231
- U-1232
- U-1233
- U-1235
- U-1271
- U-1305
- UIT-24
- UIT-25
