= German submarine U-1226 =

German World War II submarine

History

Nazi Germany
- Name: U-1226
- Ordered: 25 August 1941
- Builder: Deutsche Werft AG, Hamburg
- Yard number: 389
- Laid down: 11 January 1943
- Launched: 21 August 1943
- Commissioned: 24 November 1943
- Fate: Missing since 23 October 1944

General characteristics
- Class & type: Type IXC/40 submarine
- Displacement: 1,144 t (1,126 long tons) surfaced; 1,257 t (1,237 long tons) submerged
- Length: 76.76 m (251 ft 10 in) o/a; 58.75 m (192 ft 9 in) pressure hull
- Beam: 6.86 m (22 ft 6 in) o/a; 4.44 m (14 ft 7 in) pressure hull
- Height: 9.60 m (31 ft 6 in)
- Draught: 4.67 m (15 ft 4 in)
- Installed power: 4,400 PS (3,200 kW; 4,300 bhp) (diesels); 1,000 PS (740 kW; 990 shp) (electric)
- Propulsion: 2 shafts; 2 × diesel engines; 2 × electric motors
- Speed: 18.3 knots (33.9 km/h; 21.1 mph) surfaced; 7.3 knots (13.5 km/h; 8.4 mph) submerged
- Range: 13,850 nmi (25,650 km; 15,940 mi) at 10 knots (19 km/h; 12 mph) surfaced; 63 nmi (117 km; 72 mi) at 4 knots (7.4 km/h; 4.6 mph) submerged
- Test depth: 230 m (750 ft)
- Complement: 4 officers, 44 enlisted
- Armament: 6 × torpedo tubes (4 bow, 2 stern); 22 × 53.3 cm (21 in) torpedoes; 1 × 3.7 cm (1.5 in) Flak M42 AA gun; 2 x twin 2 cm (0.79 in) C/30 AA guns

Service record
- Part of: 31st U-boat Flotilla; 24 November 1943 – 31 July 1944; 2nd U-boat Flotilla; 1 August – 30 September 1944; 33rd U-boat Flotilla; 1 – 28 October 1944
- Identification codes: M 54 305
- Commanders: Oblt.z.S. August-Wilhelm Claussen; 24 November 1943 – 28 October 1944
- Operations: 1 patrol: 30 September – 28 October 1944
- Victories: None

German submarine U-1226 was a Type IXC/40 U-boat of Nazi Germany's Kriegsmarine during World War II.

The U-boat, built for service in the Battle of the Atlantic, was completed in Hamburg in November 1943, and placed under the command of Oberleutnant zur See August-Wilhelm Claussen (Crew X/37), whose brother Emil had been killed on board U-469 the previous year. She underwent working up cruises in the Baltic Sea before embarking on her only operational patrol from Horten Naval Base in Norway during September 1944.

== Design ==
German Type IXC/40 submarines were slightly larger than the original Type IXCs. U-1226 had a displacement of 1,144 tonnes (1,126 long tons) when at the surface and 1,257 tonnes (1,237 long tons) while submerged. The U-boat had a total length of 76.76 m (251 ft 10 in), a pressure hull length of 58.75 m (192 ft 9 in), a beam of 6.86 m (22 ft 6 in), a height of 9.60 m (31 ft 6 in), and a draught of 4.67 m (15 ft 4 in). The submarine was powered by two MAN M 9 V 40/46 supercharged four-stroke, nine-cylinder diesel engines producing a total of 4,400 metric horsepower (3,240 kW; 4,340 shp) for use while surfaced, two Siemens-Schuckert 2 GU 345/34 double-acting electric motors producing a total of 1,000 shaft horsepower (1,010 PS; 750 kW) for use while submerged. She had two shafts and two 1.92 m (6 ft) propellers. The boat was capable of operating at depths of up to 230 metres (750 ft).

The submarine had a maximum surface speed of 18.3 knots (33.9 km/h; 21.1 mph) and a maximum submerged speed of 7.3 knots (13.5 km/h; 8.4 mph). When submerged, the boat could operate for 63 nautical miles (117 km; 72 mi) at 4 knots (7.4 km/h; 4.6 mph); when surfaced, she could travel 13,850 nautical miles (25,650 km; 15,940 mi) at 10 knots (19 km/h; 12 mph). U-1226 was fitted with six 53.3 cm (21 in) torpedo tubes (four fitted at the bow and two at the stern), 22 torpedoes, and a 3.7 cm (1.5 in) Flak M42 as well as two twin 2 cm (0.79 in) C/30 anti-aircraft guns. The boat had a complement of forty-eight.

== Service history ==
This patrol was uneventful for the first three weeks during the Atlantic crossing as she deliberately avoided the highly-effective allied countermeasures. The last contact with the boat was on 23 October 1944 reporting trouble with her Schnorchel underwater-breathing apparatus after which nothing more was heard from her. It is possible she was sunk in an unrecorded encounter with an Allied ship or aircraft, or more likely she suffered some unknown catastrophic accident which claimed the boat and all her crew.

Whatever the cause, she was given up for lost in mid-November. Her remains were claimed to have been found east of Cape Cod, Massachusetts in 1993 however, this identification is unlikely. The vessel's last radio contact instructed the submarine to maintain her faulty snorkel in the upright position and return to base, giving U-1226's position as 327 nmi (605 km) south of Iceland at 56°30′N 20°00′W.

== Bibliography ==
- Busch, Rainer; Röll, Hans-Joachim (1999). German U-boat commanders of World War II : a biographical dictionary. Translated by Brooks, Geoffrey. London, Annapolis, Md: Greenhill Books, Naval Institute Press. ISBN 1-55750-186-6.
- Busch, Rainer; Röll, Hans-Joachim (1999). Deutsche U-Boot-Verluste von September 1939 bis Mai 1945 [German U-boat losses from September 1939 to May 1945]. Der U-Boot-Krieg (in German). Vol. IV. Hamburg, Berlin, Bonn: Mittler. ISBN 3-8132-0514-2.
- Gröner, Erich; Jung, Dieter; Maass, Martin (1991). German Warships 1815–1945, U-boats and Mine Warfare Vessels. Vol. 2. Translated by Thomas, Keith; Magowan, Rachel. London: Conway Maritime Press. ISBN 0-85177-593-4.
- Sharpe, Peter (1998). U-Boat Fact File. Great Britain: Midland Publishing. ISBN 1-85780-072-9.
