= German submarine U-1231 =

German World War II submarine

History

Nazi Germany
- Name: U-1231
- Ordered: 14 October 1941
- Builder: Deutsche Werft AG, Hamburg
- Yard number: 394
- Laid down: 31 March 1943
- Launched: 18 November 1943
- Commissioned: 9 February 1944
- Fate: Surrendered on 13 May 1945; Transferred as war booty to the Soviet Union

Soviet Union
- Name: N-26
- Acquired: November 1945
- Commissioned: 13 February 1946
- Decommissioned: 29 December 1955
- Renamed: B-26 on 9 June 1949; KPB-33 on 15 September 1952; UTS-23 on 27 December 1956
- Stricken: 13 January 1968
- Fate: Broken up for scrap in 1968

General characteristics
- Class & type: Type IXC/40 submarine
- Displacement: 1,144 t (1,126 long tons) surfaced; 1,257 t (1,237 long tons) submerged
- Length: 76.76 m (251 ft 10 in) o/a; 58.75 m (192 ft 9 in) pressure hull
- Beam: 6.86 m (22 ft 6 in) o/a; 4.44 m (14 ft 7 in) pressure hull
- Height: 9.60 m (31 ft 6 in)
- Draught: 4.67 m (15 ft 4 in)
- Installed power: 4,400 PS (3,200 kW; 4,300 bhp) (diesels); 1,000 PS (740 kW; 990 shp) (electric)
- Propulsion: 2 shafts; 2 × diesel engines; 2 × electric motors
- Speed: 18.3 knots (33.9 km/h; 21.1 mph) surfaced; 7.3 knots (13.5 km/h; 8.4 mph) submerged
- Range: 13,850 nmi (25,650 km; 15,940 mi) at 10 knots (19 km/h; 12 mph) surfaced; 63 nmi (117 km; 72 mi) at 4 knots (7.4 km/h; 4.6 mph) submerged
- Test depth: 230 m (750 ft)
- Complement: 4 officers, 44 enlisted
- Armament: 6 × torpedo tubes (4 bow, 2 stern); 22 × 53.3 cm (21 in) torpedoes; 1 × 3.7 cm (1.5 in) Flak M42 AA gun; 2 x twin 2 cm (0.79 in) C/30 AA guns

Service record (Kriegsmarine)
- Part of: 31st U-boat Flotilla; 9 February – 31 August 1944; 11th U-boat Flotilla; 1 – 30 September 1944; 33rd U-boat Flotilla; 1 October 1944 – 8 May 1945
- Identification codes: M 43 319
- Commanders: Kapt.z.S. Hermann Lessing; 9 February 1944 – March 1945; Oblt.z.S. Helmut Wicke; March – 13 May 1945
- Operations: 2 patrols: 1st patrol: a. 18 October 1944 – 31 January 1945; b. 1 – 5 February 1945; c. 13 – 20 April 1945; d. 22 – 24 April 1945; 2nd patrol: 27 April – 14 May 1945
- Victories: None

German submarine U-1231 was a Type IXC/40 U-boat built for Nazi Germany's Kriegsmarine during World War II.

== Design ==
German Type IXC/40 submarines were slightly larger than the original Type IXCs. U-1231 had a displacement of 1,144 tonnes (1,126 long tons) when at the surface and 1,257 tonnes (1,237 long tons) while submerged. The U-boat had a total length of 76.76 m (251 ft 10 in), a pressure hull length of 58.75 m (192 ft 9 in), a beam of 6.86 m (22 ft 6 in), a height of 9.60 m (31 ft 6 in), and a draught of 4.67 m (15 ft 4 in). The submarine was powered by two MAN M 9 V 40/46 supercharged four-stroke, nine-cylinder diesel engines producing a total of 4,400 metric horsepower (3,240 kW; 4,340 shp) for use while surfaced, two Siemens-Schuckert 2 GU 345/34 double-acting electric motors producing a total of 1,000 shaft horsepower (1,010 PS; 750 kW) for use while submerged. She had two shafts and two 1.92 m (6 ft) propellers. The boat was capable of operating at depths of up to 230 metres (750 ft).

The submarine had a maximum surface speed of 18.3 knots (33.9 km/h; 21.1 mph) and a maximum submerged speed of 7.3 knots (13.5 km/h; 8.4 mph). When submerged, the boat could operate for 63 nautical miles (117 km; 72 mi) at 4 knots (7.4 km/h; 4.6 mph); when surfaced, she could travel 13,850 nautical miles (25,650 km; 15,940 mi) at 10 knots (19 km/h; 12 mph). U-1231 was fitted with six 53.3 cm (21 in) torpedo tubes (four fitted at the bow and two at the stern), 22 torpedoes, and a 3.7 cm (1.5 in) Flak M42 as well as two twin 2 cm (0.79 in) C/30 anti-aircraft guns. The boat had a complement of forty-eight.

== Service history ==
U-1231 was ordered on 14 October 1941 from Deutsche Werft AG Weser in Hamburg-Finkenwerder under the yard number 394. Her keel was laid down on 31 March 1943 and was launched on 18 November 1943. About three months later she was commissioned into service under the command of Kapitän zur See Hermann Lessing (Crew 21) in the 31st U-boat Flotilla on 9 February 1944.

After completing training and work-up for deployment U-1231 was transferred to the 33rd U-boat Flotilla for front-line service on 1 October 1944. The U-boat left Bergen on 18 October 1944 for the first war patrol operating unsuccessfully against Allied shipping in the North Atlantic and off the coast of Canada. After returning to Flensburg on 5 February 1945, Lessing was relieved as commander by Oberleutnant zur See Helmut Winke (Crew X/39). In April 1945 'U-1231 left Kiel for the North Atlantic, again operating without success. After the German surrender, Winke took U-1231 to Dundee, from where the U-boat was transferred to Lisahally.

== Fate ==
In November 1945, U-1231 was allocated to the Soviet Union as war booty and was transferred to Libau via Copenhagen between 24 November and 5 December 1945. Renamed N-26 the U-boat was commissioned into the Soviet Navy and served with the Red Banner Baltic Fleet. On 29 December 1955, having been re-designated B-26, the U-boat was decommissioned and placed into reserve and used for training purposes. Struck from the list on 13 January 1968 and sold for scrap the U-boat was later broken up in Riga.
