= German submarine U-1233 =

German World War II submarine

History

Nazi Germany
- Name: U-1233
- Ordered: 14 October 1941
- Builder: Deutsche Werft AG, Hamburg
- Yard number: 396
- Laid down: 29 April 1943
- Launched: 23 December 1943
- Commissioned: 22 March 1944
- Fate: Surrendered on 5 May 1945; Sunk on 29 December 1945 in position 55°51′N 8°54′W during Operation Deadlight

General characteristics
- Class & type: Type IXC/40 submarine
- Displacement: 1,144 t (1,126 long tons) surfaced; 1,257 t (1,237 long tons) submerged
- Length: 76.76 m (251 ft 10 in) o/a; 58.75 m (192 ft 9 in) pressure hull
- Beam: 6.86 m (22 ft 6 in) o/a; 4.44 m (14 ft 7 in) pressure hull
- Height: 9.60 m (31 ft 6 in)
- Draught: 4.67 m (15 ft 4 in)
- Installed power: 4,400 PS (3,200 kW; 4,300 bhp) (diesels); 1,000 PS (740 kW; 990 shp) (electric)
- Propulsion: 2 shafts; 2 × diesel engines; 2 × electric motors
- Speed: 18.3 knots (33.9 km/h; 21.1 mph) surfaced; 7.3 knots (13.5 km/h; 8.4 mph) submerged
- Range: 13,850 nmi (25,650 km; 15,940 mi) at 10 knots (19 km/h; 12 mph) surfaced; 63 nmi (117 km; 72 mi) at 4 knots (7.4 km/h; 4.6 mph) submerged
- Test depth: 230 m (750 ft)
- Complement: 4 officers, 44 enlisted
- Armament: 6 × torpedo tubes (4 bow, 2 stern); 22 × 53.3 cm (21 in) torpedoes; 1 × 3.7 cm (1.5 in) Flak M42 AA gun; 2 x twin 2 cm (0.79 in) C/30 AA guns

Service record
- Part of: 31st U-boat Flotilla; 22 March – 31 October 1944; 33rd U-boat Flotilla; 1 November 1944 – 5 May 1945
- Identification codes: M 49 604
- Commanders: K.Kapt. Hans-Joachim Kuhn; 22 March 1944 – 14 April 1945; Oblt.z.S. Heinrich Niemeyer; 15 April – 5 May 1945
- Operations: 1 patrol: a. 24 December 1944 – 28 March 1945; b. 31 March – 3 April 1945
- Victories: None

German submarine U-1233 was a Type IXC/40 U-boat built for Nazi Germany's Kriegsmarine during World War II.

== Design ==
German Type IXC/40 submarines were slightly larger than the original Type IXCs. U-1233 had a displacement of 1,144 tonnes (1,126 long tons) when at the surface and 1,257 tonnes (1,237 long tons) while submerged. The U-boat had a total length of 76.76 m (251 ft 10 in), a pressure hull length of 58.75 m (192 ft 9 in), a beam of 6.86 m (22 ft 6 in), a height of 9.60 m (31 ft 6 in), and a draught of 4.67 m (15 ft 4 in). The submarine was powered by two MAN M 9 V 40/46 supercharged four-stroke, nine-cylinder diesel engines producing a total of 4,400 metric horsepower (3,240 kW; 4,340 shp) for use while surfaced, two Siemens-Schuckert 2 GU 345/34 double-acting electric motors producing a total of 1,000 shaft horsepower (1,010 PS; 750 kW) for use while submerged. She had two shafts and two 1.92 m (6 ft) propellers. The boat was capable of operating at depths of up to 230 metres (750 ft).

The submarine had a maximum surface speed of 18.3 knots (33.9 km/h; 21.1 mph) and a maximum submerged speed of 7.3 knots (13.5 km/h; 8.4 mph). When submerged, the boat could operate for 63 nautical miles (117 km; 72 mi) at 4 knots (7.4 km/h; 4.6 mph); when surfaced, she could travel 13,850 nautical miles (25,650 km; 15,940 mi) at 10 knots (19 km/h; 12 mph). U-1233 was fitted with six 53.3 cm (21 in) torpedo tubes (four fitted at the bow and two at the stern), 22 torpedoes, and a 3.7 cm (1.5 in) Flak M42 as well as two twin 2 cm (0.79 in) C/30 anti-aircraft guns. The boat had a complement of forty-eight.

== Service history ==
U-1233 was ordered on 14 October 1941 from Deutsche Werft AG in Hamburg-Finkenwerder under the yard number 396. Her keel was laid down on 29 April 1943 and was launched on 23 December 1943. About three months later she was commissioned into service under the command of Korvettenkapitän Hans-Joachim Kuhn (Crew 31) in the 31st U-boat Flotilla on 22 March 1944.

After completing training and work-up for deployment U-1233 was transferred to the 33rd U-boat Flotilla for front-line service on 1 November 1944. The U-boat left Horten Naval Base on 11 December 1944 for the first and only war patrol. After returning to Kiel, Kuhn was relieved as commander by Oberleutnant zur See Heinrich Niemeyer (Crew X/39) on 15 April 1945. In May 1945 U-1233 transferred to Fredericia in order to surrender to Allied forces. En route U-1233 and two accompanying U-boats - U-155 and U-680 - were attacked by Allied aircraft. In the course of the attack one P-51 Mustang of No. 126 Squadron RAF was shot down.

In June 1945 the surrendered U-boats were transferred to Wilhelmshaven under British guard from where they sailed for Loch Ryan, a collecting point for Operation Deadlight. On 28 December 1945 U-1233 was towed to sea by HMS Freedom. When the cable slipped the U-boat was sunk by artillery fire from HMS Onslaught on 29 December 1945 in position 54°51′N 8°54′W

== Bibliography ==
- Busch, Rainer; Röll, Hans-Joachim (1999). German U-boat commanders of World War II : a biographical dictionary. Translated by Brooks, Geoffrey. London, Annapolis, Md: Greenhill Books, Naval Institute Press. ISBN 1-55750-186-6.
- Busch, Rainer; Röll, Hans-Joachim (1999). Deutsche U-Boot-Verluste von September 1939 bis Mai 1945 [German U-boat losses from September 1939 to May 1945]. Der U-Boot-Krieg (in German). Vol. IV. Hamburg, Berlin, Bonn: Mittler. ISBN 3-8132-0514-2.
- Gröner, Erich; Jung, Dieter; Maass, Martin (1991). German Warships 1815–1945, U-boats and Mine Warfare Vessels. Vol. 2. Translated by Thomas, Keith; Magowan, Rachel. London: Conway Maritime Press. ISBN 0-85177-593-4.
