= Type VII submarine =

German submarine class of World War II

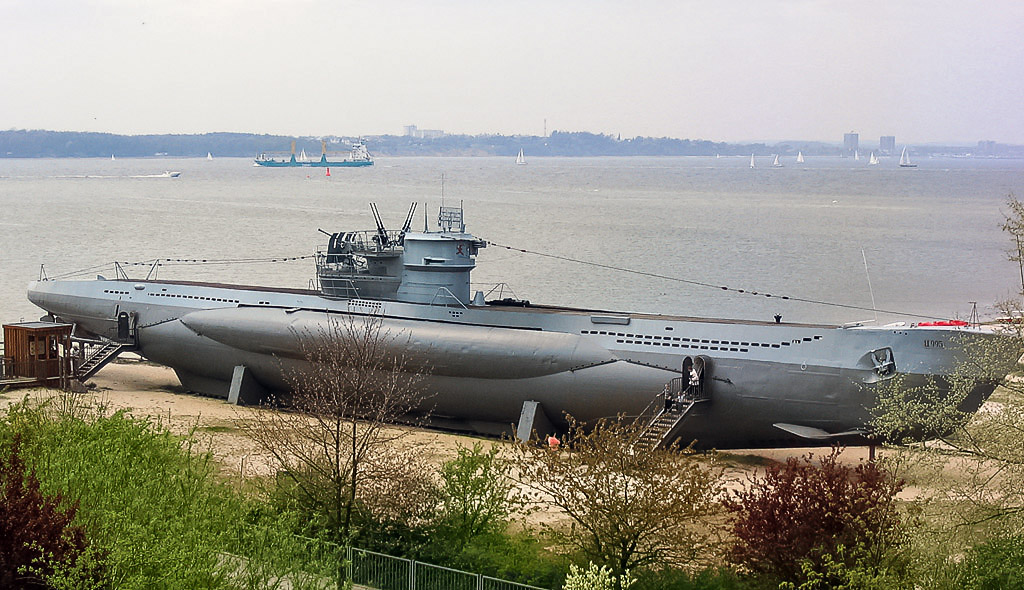
- U-995 Type VIIC/41 at the Laboe Naval Memorial near Kiel

Class overview
- Name: Type VII
- Builders: Blohm & Voss, Hamburg; Danziger Werft, Danzig; Deutsche Werke, Kiel; Deschimag A.G. Weser, Hamburg; Flender Werke, Lübeck; Flensburger Schiffahrt-Gesellschaft; Germaniawerft, Kiel; Howaldtswerke, Kiel; Kriegsmarinewerft, Wilhelmshaven; Neptun Werft, Rostock; Nordseewerke, Emden; Schichau-Werke, Danzig; Stettiner Oderwerke, Stettin; Stettiner Vulcan, Stettin; Stülken & Sohn, Hamburg; Vegesacker Werft, Kiel
- Operators: Kriegsmarine; Soviet Navy; Royal Norwegian Navy; Royal Navy; French Navy; Spanish Navy
- Preceded by: Type UB III, Vetehinen class
- Succeeded by: Type XXI (Late-war replacement)
- Subclasses: Built; Type VIIA; Type VIIB; Type VIIC; Type VIIC/41; Type VIID; Type VIIF; Not built; Type VIIC/42; Type VIIC/43; Type VIIE
- Cost: 4,189,000 ℛ︁ℳ︁
- In commission: 1936 – 1970
- Planned: 1452
- Building: 717
- Completed: 709
- Preserved: 1

General characteristics (Type VIIC)
- Displacement: 769 tonnes (757 long tons) surfaced; 871 t (857 long tons) submerged
- Length: 67.20 m (220 ft 6 in) o/a; 50.50 m (165 ft 8 in) pressure hull
- Beam: 6.20 m (20 ft 4 in) (o/a); 4.70 m (15 ft 5 in) (pressure hull)
- Draft: 4.74 m (15 ft 7 in)
- Propulsion: 2 × diesel engines totalling 3,200 bhp (2,400 kW) surfaced; 2 × electrical engines totalling 750 hp (560 kW) submerged
- Speed: 17.7 knots (32.8 km/h; 20.4 mph) surfaced; 7.6 knots (14.1 km/h; 8.7 mph) submerged
- Range: 8,500 nmi (15,700 km; 9,800 mi) at 10 knots (19 km/h; 12 mph) surfaced; 80 nmi (150 km; 92 mi) at 4 knots (7.4 km/h; 4.6 mph) submerged
- Complement: 44–52 officers & ratings
- Armament: 5 × 53.3 cm (21 in) torpedo tubes (4 bow, 1 stern); 14 × torpedoes or 26 TMA or 39 TMB mines; Until 1943; 1 × 8.8 cm (3.5 in) SK C/35; 1 × 2 cm (0.79 in) FlaK 30; After 1943: Deck gun removed, various anti-aircraft weaponry

The Type VII is a class of medium U-boats built for Nazi Germany's Kriegsmarine from 1935 to 1945. Derived from the World War I design of the Type UB III and the Vetehinen class built for Finland, the Type VII was designed for attacking the North Atlantic convoy lanes and formed the backbone of the German effort in the Battle of the Atlantic during World War II. The Type VII came in several subtypes: The first subtype VIIA had some shortcomings in handling, range and armament, and these shortcomings were addressed in the subsequent VIIB. When more space was needed for a sonar, a slightly enlargened version VIIC was put into production. The fourth subtype VIIC/41 featured a strengthened pressure hull for improved diving depth. Further subtypes included a mine laying Type VIID and a torpedo supply U-boat Type VIIF.

The Type VII U-boat building program began slowly after the Anglo-German Naval Agreement in 1935, by the beginning of the war on 3 September 1939 only eighteen Type VII were in service, but by the end of the war a total of 709 boats had been commissioned. (Note: Totals vary in every source. Totals are difficult to calculate since there is no agreement on hull numbers associated with subtypes and on the definition of when a boat can be included in the count: on being planned, ordered, started, laid down, launched, completed or commissioned.) Many more were planned, ordered or even laid down, but the massive building program was abruptly halted in September 1943 when it became clear that this class had become obsolete and construction of U-boats had to focus on the newer elektroboote. At the end of the war, most of the remaining boats were scuttled either by their crews in Operation Regenbogen or later by the British in Operation Deadlight. A few survivors served in foreign navies, the last one was decommissioned in 1970. The lone surviving example, U-995, is on display at the Laboe Naval Memorial located in Laboe, Schleswig-Holstein, Germany.

== Design ==
After the defeat in World War I, the Treaty of Versailles forbade Germany to build submarines. Germany circumvented the treaty by setting up the Dutch dummy company NV Ingenieurskantoor voor Scheepsbouw Den Haag (I.v.S) which continued to design submarines. Based on the World War I design of the Type UB III and its never-built successors Type UF and Type UG, IVS designed the Vetehinen class and in 1931 built three submarines in Finland. Already in 1933 the Reichsmarine wanted to start the construction of a 500 t (490-long-ton) medium attack U-boat, capable of operating in the North Atlantic. Parts were produced, but Hitler held back assembly not wanting to offend Great-Britain with an open breach of the Versailles treaty. The first orders for Type VII U-boats were only given in January 1935, well before Hitler openly renounced the Treaty of Versailles in March 1935. This breach of the Treaty of Versailles was officialized with Great-Britain in the Anglo-German Naval Agreement, where Germany promised to limit the total tonnage of German U-boats to 45% of total tonnage of British submarines.

The Type VII was designed as a single-hull submarine, meaning that the outer hull was also the pressure hull. Although there were saddle tanks, most of the fuel was stored within the pressure hull, which reduced significantly the risk of oil leaks in case of depth-charge attacks. The saddle tanks contained only diving and trimming tanks. The main ballast tank was also located within the pressure hull, and more diving tanks were added outboard in the bow and stern which resulted in a very short diving time of 30 seconds. The deck casing streamlined the pressure hull at the bow and stern.

Type VII submarines were the most widely built U-boats of the war and were the most produced submarine class in history, with 709 commissioned.

== Armament ==
All Type VII U-boats were armed with four bow and one stern 53.3 cm (21 in) torpedo tubes. Five torpedoes were carried in the tubes; in the forward torpedo compartment four extra torpedoes were stored below the inner deck and two more were stored in cradles on the inner deck. There was no aft torpedo room; the aft torpedo tube was located in the electrical engine compartment with one reload stored below deck between the two electrical engines. Two extra spare torpedoes were carried externally in a watertight container, one located above the forward torpedo compartment and one behind the conning tower. There were torpedo hatches fore and aft through which torpedoes could be reloaded at harbour, but it was also possible to take on these external spares at sea through these two hatches, by mounting a collapsible trough and a tripod. When during a patrol a spare torpedo was transferred from the external canisters to the inner torpedo room, the torpedo hatch had to be opened and the U-boat was unable to dive in that state. Hence this could only be done in low-risk areas.

At the start of the U-boat building program in 1935, the Germans were only allowed to build a limited number of U-boats and they could not afford to build specialized minelaying U-boats. Instead they developed sea mines that could be laid by any U-boat through the torpedo tubes. A TMA moored mine could be laid in waters with a depth of maximum 270 m (890 ft) and had a length of 3.64 m (11 ft 11 in). Each internal torpedo could be substituted by two TMA mines. The TMB ground mine had a length of 2.31 m (7 ft 7 in) so that for each torpedo, three TMB's could be loaded. In November 1939 a heavier TMC ground mine with a length of 3.39 m (11 ft 1 in) came into service. At the beginning of the war, a Type VII U-boat would typically load eight TMA or twelve TMB in its torpedo tubes on a minelaying mission, and then continue its patrol with the spare torpedoes.

The Type VII mounted an 8.8-centimetre (3.5 in) quick-firing deck gun. This gun was intended for finishing off sinking ships, so that torpedoes could be economized. The gun could also be used in the beginning of the war to give stop sign to ships under the prize law. A U-boat was very vulnerable at the surface and not fit for gun duels as a single hit on the pressure hull could render it unable to dive. From the end of 1942 onwards, the deck gun was removed to save weight for extra anti-aircraft guns. U-boats operating in the Mediterranean were the last to give up their deck gun. In July 1944, when operations were mounted in the Baltic Sea against Soviet patrols and for shore bombardment, deck guns were re-installed on some boats.

As a defense against aircraft, Type VII U-boats received one 2 cm (0.79 in) C/30 anti-aircraft gun which was mounted on a platform at the back of the conning tower. By mid-1942 Allied aircraft attacks had become so frequent that an upgrade was needed. The platform was enlarged so that more guns could be mounted and a second platform was added behind and below the first one. A more powerful gun was needed but was not readily available. As a stopgap solution, the 2 cm C/30 was replaced with the improved 2 cm C/38 gun. This gun was more reliable and had a slightly increased rate of fire. The intention was to install two twin C/38 mountings on the higher platform and one quadruple C/38 mounting on the lower platform, but if sufficient twin or quadruple mountings were not available, single C/38 were installed instead. The first single C/38s were installed in mid-January 1943 and the first quad C/38 mounting in March. The first twin C/38 mountings became available on 15 June and were standard by October. On 30 June 1943 U-boats were ordered to delay their sailings until they had received an anti-aircraft gun upgrade. The 2 cm C/38 gun proved to be too weak, a heavier gun was needed but the existing 3.7 cm SK C/30 was not adequate for its slow rate of fire. A naval version of the 3.7 cm Flak 43 was developed as a substitute and was ready for standard installation by November 1943. The new 3.7 cm gun replaced the quadruple 2 cm on the lower platform. There were some experiments with other anti-aircraft gun configurations, but these were not continued as with the arrival of the snorkel, U-boats could avoid aircraft by cruising submerged so the urgence for improved anti-aircraft guns diminished.

== Subclasses ==
=== Type VIIA ===
A Type VIIA U-boat (Note: In some works, such as Blair (1998) and Westwood (1984), this type is called Type VII not Type VIIA) had an overall length of 64.51 m (211 ft 8 in), a beam of 5.85 m (19 ft 2 in) and a draft of 4.37 m (14 ft 4 in). On the surface a Type VIIA displaced 626 metric tons (616 long tons), and submerged 745 t (730 long tons). The length of the pressure hull was 44.5 m (146 ft) and had a maximum diameter of 4.70 m (15 ft 5 in). Type VIIA U-boats had an externally mounted aft torpedo tube which could not be reloaded; they did not have a spare aft torpedo nor external canisters to store spare torpedoes.

The boat was powered on the surface by two MAN AG, six-cylinder, four-stroke M6V40/46 diesel engines, giving a total of 2,300 brake horsepower (1,700 kW), which gave a maximum speed of 16 knots (30 km/h; 18 mph). With a fuel capacity of 67 t (66 long tons), the range was 6,200 nmi (11,500 km; 7,100 mi) at 10 knots (19 km/h; 12 mph). When submerged it was propelled by two double-acting electric motors, giving a total of 750 horsepower (560 kW). Maximum submerged speed was 8 knots (15 km/h; 9.2 mph) and maximum range was 74–94 nmi (137–174 km; 85–108 mi) at 4 knots (7.4 km/h; 4.6 mph).

Ten Type VIIA boats were built between 1935 and 1937 in two batches: six at Deschimag AG Weser in Bremen and four at Friedrich Krupp Germaniawerft, Kiel. The first Type VIIA was laid down on 11 November 1935, launched on 24 June 1936 and commissioned on 12 August 1936. Six were lost in action, two were lost in accidents in the Baltic sea and the remaining two were scuttled on 4 May 1945.

=== Type VIIB ===
After evaluating and comparing the commissioned Type I and Type VII U-boats, the Kriegsmarine asked for an improved version of the Type VII which would be named Type VIIB. Four requirements were formulated: a smaller turning circle, better surface speed, larger range and more torpedoes. Manoeuvrability was improved by installing one rudder in line with each of the two propellers so that the wash of the propeller had much more effect on the rudder. This change fitted well with another requirement of improved armament and reserve torpedo capacity. The external stern torpedo tube could now be mounted within the pressure hull, between the two rudders. The internal tube allowed for reloading and for firing on the surface. One spare torpedo for the stern tube was carried internally and two more spare torpedoes, one below the forward deck and one below the afterdeck, were stored externally in pressure-tight containers.

To improve the range, the hull was extended by 2 m (6 ft 7 in) to increase the internal fuel storage, and saddle tanks with 40 t (39 long tons) of fuel added 2,500 nautical miles (4,600 km; 2,900 mi) of range at 10 knots (19 km/h; 12 mph). With the installation of fuel tanks in the saddle tanks, the advantage of having all fuel stored internally within the pressure hull, and hence avoiding the risk of oil leaks when the outer skin was damaged, was lost.

Two types of diesel engines were installed in the Type VIIB : the first one was the same MAN M6V40/46 used in the Type VIIA, the second one was the near identical Germaniawerft F46. Power output of these engines was increased by installing superchargers. On the MAN engine the compressor of the supercharger was driven by exhaust gasses and power increased to 2,800 bhp (2,100 kW). The Germaniawerft diesel had a compressor driven by the shaft of the engine itself, and delivered 3,200 bhp (2,400 kW) in total. MAN powered U-boats reached a top speed of 17.2 knots (31.9 km/h; 19.8 mph), with Germaniawerft diesels top speed was 17.9 knots (33.2 km/h; 20.6 mph).

All these changes increased the surface displacement of the Type VIIB with 120 t (120 long tons), but standard displacement rose only from 500 t (490 long tons) to 517 t (509 long tons). The first seven Type VIIB were ordered on 21 November 1936 from Germaniawerft, followed by two more on 15 May 1937 and again two more on 16 July 1937. After the revision of the Anglo-German Naval Agreement, further orders for four Type VIIB were given to Germaniawerft, Bremer Vulkan and Flender Werke each. Flender Werke also built a fifth Type VIIB U-83 under an export contract but the boat was taken over on 8 August 1938. It lacked a stern tube. At the beginning of World War II, only eight Type VIIB were commissioned, a total of twenty-four Type VIIB entered service between 1938 and 1941: twenty were lost at sea and the remaining four were scuttled at the end of the war.

=== Type VIIC ===
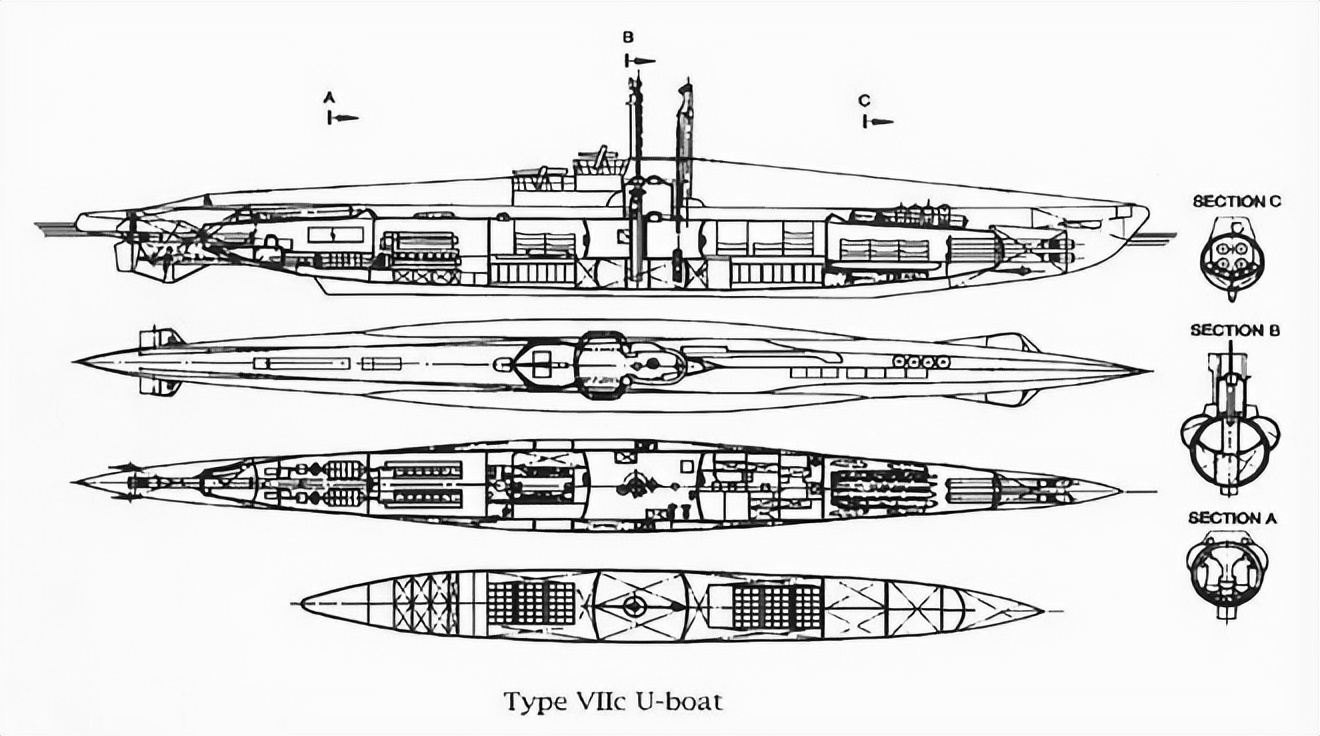
A cross-section of a Type VIIC U-boat

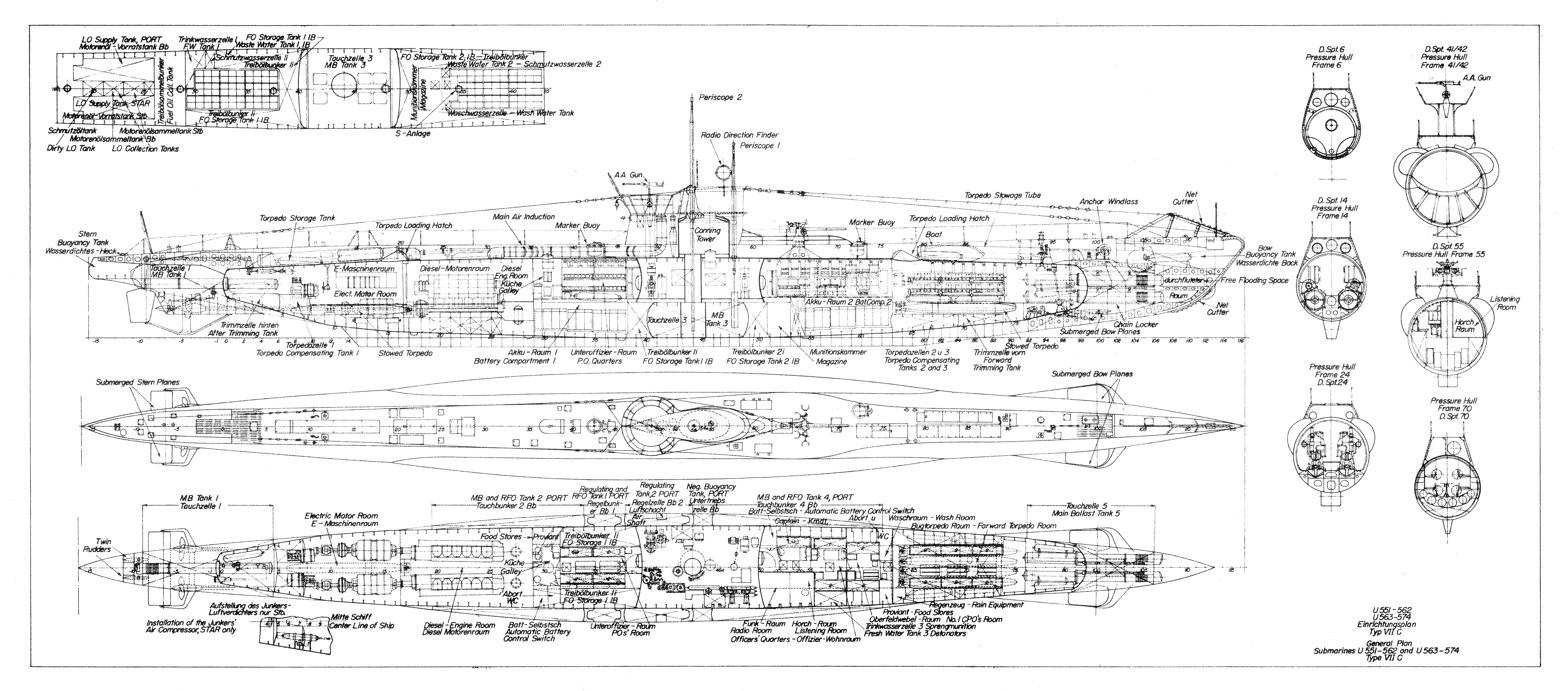
Detailed drawing of a Type VIIC U-boat

During World War I, many U-boats were lost in British minefields. The German Navy wanted to equip U-boats with a sonar in order to allow them to navigate through minefields. A full frame section of 0.6 m (2 ft 0 in) was added in the control room to provide space for a sonar room, resulting in the Type VIIC. The extra weight reduced speed marginally, and the extra space in the saddle tanks was not used for fuel but for an extra buoyancy tank. One of the electrical air compressors was replaced by a Junkers diesel-powered air compressor in order to reduce the demands on the electrical systems of the U-boat. As in 1940 the Germans conquered many U-boat bases in France which were not threatened by minefields, in the end the sonar was not installed in any Type VII.

A few of the early Type VIIC U-boats were equipped with the 2,800 bhp (2,100 kW) MAN M6V40/46, which gave a top speed of 17 kn (31 km/h; 20 mph), others had the 3,200 bhp (2,400 kW) Germaniawerft F46 which gave a top speed of 17.7 kn (32.8 km/h; 20.4 mph).

They had the same torpedo tube arrangement as their predecessors, except for U-72, U-78, U-80, U-554, and U-555, which due to shortages, had only two bow tubes. These U-boats were used for training only. Seven other U-boats U-203, U-331, U-351, U-352, U-401, U-431, and U-651 had no stern tube mounted for the same reason, but these U-boats were used on war patrols. The first VIIC boat U-93 was commissioned on 30 July 1940. By the end of the war, 577 Type VIIC U-boats had been built at fifteen shipyards.

==== Type VIIC/41 ====
In 1941 it was examined how U-boat performance could be improved. A first requirement for higher surface speed could not be met without large modifications to the design. A new design would disrupt current production of U-boats too much, so it was investigated how the diving depth could be increased. By saving 11.5 t (11.3 long tons) weight on simpler diesel and electric engine installations, the weight of the hull could be augmented with 10 t (9.8 long tons) By increasing the thickness of the hull from 18.5 mm (0.73 in) to 21 mm (0.83 in) mm, diving depth increased by 20%. The bow was extended by 13 cm (5.1 in) in order to improve seaworthiness. This improved design was called Type VIIC/41.

The first Type VIIC/41 were ordered on 14 October 1941 by instructing the yards to convert existing but not yet laid down orders of Type VIIC to the new design. The first Type VIIC/41 U-292 was delivered on 25 August 1943. On 30 September 1943 it was decided to stop laying down new Type VIIC/41 U-boats in order to free up space in the yards for the newer types of U-boats, the Elektroboote. Only the small Flender Werke yard was allowed to continue since it could not build the new, bigger U-boats. In this small yard the last Type VIIC/41 U-1308 was laid down on 28 January 1944 and commissioned in January 1945. A total of 88 were commissioned. All Type VIIC/41 from U-1271 onwards lacked the fittings to handle mines. The only preserved Type VII U-boat is the VIIC/41 U-995 which is on display at the Laboe Naval Memorial.

==== Type VIIC/42 ====
The greatest danger for a submerged U-boat was to be detected by sonar. By coating the outer hull of a U-boat with rubber anechoic tiles, it was hoped that the acoustic sonar waves would be absorbed rather than reflected. During 1941, tests with the rubber coating were conducted on U-67, but these tests were disappointing and the project was abandoned. The only solution left was to increase once more the diving depth by using thicker steel for the pressure hull. The steel rolling equipment at the builders yard limited the maximum thickness to 28 mm (1.1 in). The weight of the hull increased from 68.3 t (67.2 long tons) to 154.3 t (151.9 long tons) needing an increase from 4.7 m (15 ft 5 in) to 5 m (16 ft 5 in) in beam, in order to create more buoyancy. The saddle tanks were also enlarged so that range increased to 12,600 nautical miles (23,300 km; 14,500 mi). The maximum speed of 17 knots (31 km/h; 20 mph) of a Type VIIC proved to be insufficient for keeping in touch with the enemy during convoy battles and an increase in top speed was also required. The same diesel engines were used, but the hull was lengthened by 0.8 metres (2 ft 7 in) to provide space for more powerful superchargers for the diesels. With the additional power, it was hoped speed would increase to 18.6 knots (34.4 km/h; 21.4 mph).

Even before the design was finalized on 10 November 1942, a preliminary order of twelve boats had already been placed. By 17 April 1943 174 boats had been ordered from twelve shipbuilding yards, but due to problems with producing the new steel alloy for the reinforced pressure hull, construction was slow to start. Assembly at the yards had not yet started when all orders were cancelled on 24 July 1943 in favor of the new Type XXI.

==== Type VIIC/43 ====
Early in 1943 it became obvious that operations during convoy battles demanded a better armament with a higher number of ready-to-fire torpedo tubes rather than fewer torpedo tubes with more reloads. During convoy battles an attacking U-boat rarely got the occasion to withdraw to reload and attack again. Therefore, a new design VIIC/43 was made based on the Type VIIC/42 but with six bow torpedo tubes and two at the stern. But as the new deep-diving U-boats were urgently needed at the front, it was decided on 11 May 1943 to cancel this project as it would delay production of the Type VIIC/41 and VIIC/42.

=== Type VIID ===
At the beginning of World War II, four large Type XB minelayers were under construction, intended for laying anchored SMA mines in distant waters. Any type of U-boat could lay TMB ground mines through torpedo tubes, but a need still existed for a medium-sized U-boat able to lay SMA mines on British and French coasts. To fill this gap, the Type VIIC was developed into a Type VIID SMA minelayer by simply adding a 9.8 m (32 ft 2 in) section with five mineshafts between the control room and the crew compartment of the petty officers. As the saddle tanks also covered the extra section, the fuel storage and range increased considerably. Six boats were ordered on 16 February 1940, and the first was laid down on 1 October 1940. The six Type VIID U-boats were in service in early 1942, but at that time, the SMA mine had not yet been cleared for front usage. As the Type VIIDs had kept the same offensive capacities as their Type VIIC sisterships, they were used for regular combat patrols, where they could benefit from their extra range.

=== Type VIIE ===
The Type VIIE was a project for trying out new lightweight Deutz V12 two-stroke diesel engines in a Type VIIC. The idea was again to try to save weight so that extra weight could go to the pressure hull. This project remained a design, as this new engine was delayed and finally abandoned before any construction had started.

=== Type VIIF ===
Up to mid-1941, providing U-boats with spare torpedoes had been possible through surface supply ships at remote locations, but after the sinking of the German battleship Bismarck in May 1941, all supply ships were hunted down. Towards the end of 1941, attempts to resupply from the German auxiliary cruiser Atlantis ended in disaster when both the auxiliary cruiser and her supply ship Python were sunk by a British cruiser. The Type XIV supply boats were intended for fuel resupply and carried only four spare torpedoes. The large Type XB minelayer was also scheduled to be used for supply, but could carry only nine spares. Designing a whole new large torpedo transporter would eat away much resources both from the planning department and the shipbuilding yards, so the simplest and best idea was to add an extra compartment to a Type VIIC, as had been done before with the Type VIID minelayer. The extra compartment measured 10.5 m (34 ft 5 in) and had an extra torpedo hatch to load 20 (Note: Various numbers are found for the number of torpedoes in the extra compartment. Twenty, 21, 24 and 39 are sometimes mentioned, Rössler mentions 21 in text, but on the detailed drawings of the Type VIIF layout, 'torpedo room for twenty torpedoes' is explicitly written. Longitudal cross-sections usually show four banks with a width of six torpedoes. In Bagnasco, a transversal cross-section shows places for five torpedoes on the lowest bank, only the bank above has six torpedoes. The two top banks have four and five torpedoes, since some space is needed for the passway. Outside the pressure hull, two extra water-tight canisters for spare torpedoes are in this section of the boat. Stern writes that crew members of the Type VIIF U-1059 mentioned 22 torpedoes in this section, without specifying whether that includes the torpedoes in the external canisters or not.) torpedoes, which were stored in four banks.

The Type VIIF had the same engines as the Type VIIC, but at 1,084 t (1,067 long tons) was much heavier. However, with a more streamlined hull than the Type VIID, she lost relatively little speed. As with the Type VIID, the saddle tanks ran along the extra compartment and provided extra fuel and range up to 14,700 nmi (27,200 km; 16,900 mi). On 22 August 1941, four Type VIIFs were ordered, with expected delivery at the beginning of 1943. When these four boats entered service in early 1943, using them in their intended role was no longer realistic as Allied air power made supply missions in the battle zones too dangerous. Instead, the boats were used to supply remote bases in Norway, and two were sent to supply the Monsun Gruppe in Penang, Malaysia.

== Operational history ==
Ever since Karl Dönitz became supreme commander of the U-boat division in 1935, he advocated the construction of the Type VII medium attack U-boat, suitable for actions against convoys using his Wolfpack tactic. Erich Raeder, the head of the German Navy, though, imposed a more balanced U-boat fleet, including minelayers, U-cruisers, and coastal submarines. As a consequence, at the beginning of World War II, only 18 of the 56 commissioned U-boats were Type VIIs. This limited number of Type VIIs achieved two major successes, though, in the first two months: U-29 sank the aircraft carrier HMS Courageous and U-47 sank the battleship HMS Royal Oak.

In November 1939, an ambitious "Enlarged U-boat Construction Program" was set up, which called for the yearly construction of 275 U-boats, including 207 Type VIIs. Only two types of attack U-boats were to be built in a ratio of three to one - the Type VII and the larger Type IX. In June 1940, this program was revised due to shortages in skilled labor and raw materials. The "Restricted U-boat Construction Program" foresaw the construction of 292 U-boats by 1 January 1942, of which 191 were type VIIs.

After the Battle of France, U-boats were able to start the campaign against convoys in earnest, operating from French bases that were much closer to the vital North Atlantic convoy lanes. Four Type VII U-boats distinguished themselves in this First Happy Time: U-48 became the top-scoring U-boat of World War II with three successive commanders each earning the Knight's Cross of the Iron Cross for sinking over 100,000 GRT of shipping. The U-47, U-99, and U-100 were also top-scoring U-boats, but after their loss in March 1941, the attacks on the convoy lanes stalled. The focus of the U-boat war shifted deeper into the Atlantic, making patrols for the short-legged Type VIIs less effective and results dropped.

Two other battlefields drained Type VII U-boats away from the battle of the Atlantic in 1941; Hitler insisted Type VIIs be sent to the Mediterranean Sea to help the Italians, and some more had to stay in Norway as a safeguard against an anticipated Allied invasion there. Between September 1941 and April 1944, a total of 62 Type VII was transferred from the Atlantic force to the Mediterranean. The first U-boats achieved two spectacular successes in 1941, when U-81 sank the aircraft carrier HMS Ark Royal and U-331 the battleship HMS Barham. A further major success was the sinking of the aircraft carrier HMS Eagle by U-74 in 1942 during Operation Pedestal. The last remaining U-boat in the Mediterranean was lost in September 1944.

When war broke out with the United States in December 1941, Type VIIs were sent to attack shipping off Newfoundland and Labrador, and the larger Type IXs were sent to the East Coast. Type VII commanders found out that by keeping a very economical speed and cramping every available space with fuel and food, they were able to operate one week off the East Coast and join the Second Happy Time. With the support of supply U-boats, Type VIIs were able to operate as far as the Gulf of Mexico and the Central Atlantic. Between December 1941 and August 1942, Type VIIs mounted 104 patrols to American waters and sank 225 ships totaling 1,111,371 GRT, while Type IXs executed 80 patrols and sank 384 ships totaling 2,011,085 GRT.

When the campaign on the East Coast petered out in the summer of 1942, the attacks on the convoy lanes were resumed. Type VII U-boats still needed resupply at sea to operate in the Mid-Atlantic gap. On 31 December 1942, 199 attack U-boats were in service, of which 148 were Type VIIs and 49 were Type IXs. Nineteen Type VIIs were operating in the Arctic and 23 were in the Mediterranean. All other U-boats were allocated to the Atlantic. The convoy battles reached a peak in March 1943, but on 24 May, U-boats withdrew from the North Atlantic after heavy losses and ever-diminishing results. On 1 April 1944, all Type VIIs were ordered to remain in port in France and Norway in anticipation of Operation Overlord, but eventually, these boats were not able to affect the invasion.

Number of attack U-boats allocated to the Atlantic
	1942			1943						1944	
	Jun	Sep	Dec	Mar	Apr	May	Jun	Sep	Dec	Mar	May
Type VII	51	77	100	125	123	134	119	93	90	65	58
Type IX	55	47	48	54	54	52	46	30	32	35	31

== In foreign service ==
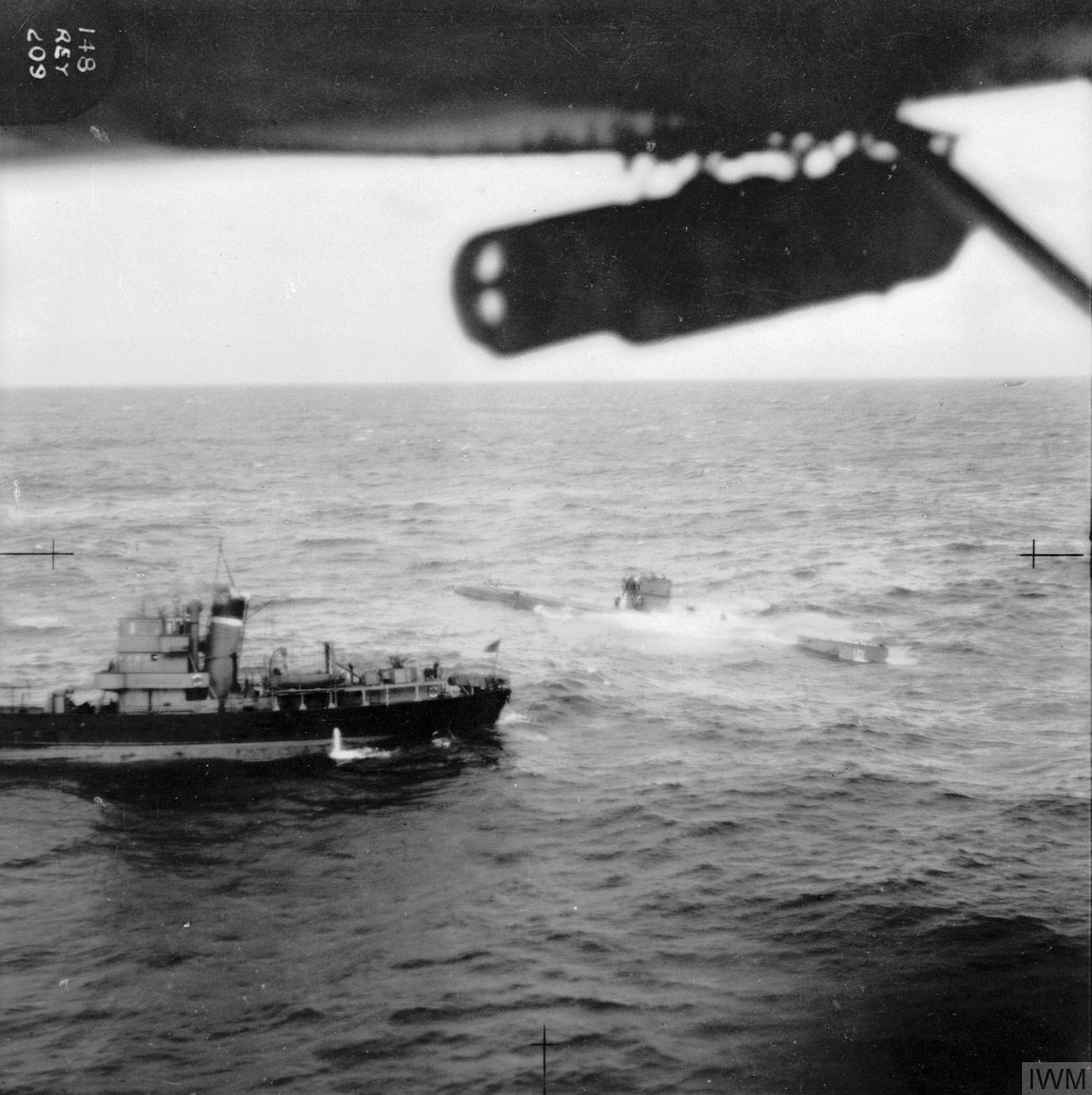
- The capture of U-570, which was commissioned in the Royal Navy as HMS Graph
  On 27 August 1941, aircraft surprised U-570 on the surface south of Iceland. Damaged by depth charges, the U-boat was unable to escape further attack and surrendered. British ships took the U-boat in tow to Iceland, where she was beached. U-570 was repaired and entered service as HMS Graph with the Royal Navy on 31 October 1941.
- On 1 May 1942, U-573 was heavily damaged by aircraft east of Gibraltar. She limped into the neutral Spanish port of Cartagena, Spain. She was allowed three months for repairs by the Spanish authorities, but the U-boat could not be repaired in time and was finally sold to Spain, where she entered service as S-01.
- U-471 was destroyed in the military port of Toulon by an air raid, but was repaired in 1945 and served until 1963 in the French Navy as Millé.
- U-766 was decommissioned on 20 August 1944, and disabled on 15 September 1944 in the port of La Pallice, when the port fell to Allied forces. She was declared a war prize, repaired, and recommissioned in the French Navy as Laubie.
- Three U-boats, which surrendered to the Allies in May 1945, were transferred to the Royal Norwegian Navy: U-926, U-995, and U-1202 entered service as Kya, Kaura, and Kinn, respectively.
- U-1057, U-1058, U-1064, and U-1305 surrendered at the end of the war, and were allocated as war prizes to the Soviet Navy; they were renamed S-81, S-82, S-83, and S-48, respectively.
- On the Schichau-Werke yard in Gdańsk, the Russians laid down at least three Type VIIC/41s with parts intended for the German U-1174, U-1176, and U-1177. Possibly, also some Type VIIC/42s were built there.

== Specifications ==
Class	VIIA	VIIB	VIIC	VIIC/41	VIIC/42	VIID	VIIF
Number planned	10	24	643	323	442	6	4
Number started (Note: 'Started' means that materials for the construction had been ordered.)	10	24	593	239	165	6	4
Number laid down	10	24	582	91	0	6	4
Number commissioned	10	24	577	88	0	6	4
Displacement surfaced	626 t (616 long tons)	753 t (741 long tons)	769 t (757 long tons)	759 t (747 long tons)	999 t (983 long tons)	965 t (950 long tons)	1,084 t (1,067 long tons)
Displacement submerged	745 t (733 long tons)	857 t (843 long tons)	871 t (857 long tons)	860 t (850 long tons)	1,099 t (1,082 long tons)	1,080 t (1,060 long tons)	1,181 t (1,162 long tons)
Length overall	64.51 m (211 ft 8 in)	66.5 m (218 ft 2 in)	67.2 m (220 ft 6 in)	67.2 m (220 ft 6 in)	68.7 m (225 ft 5 in)	76.9 m (252 ft 4 in)	77.63 m (254 ft 8 in)
Length pressure hull	44.5 m (146 ft 0 in)	48.8 m (160 ft 1 in)	50.50 m (165 ft 8 in)	50.50 m (165 ft 8 in)	50.9 m (167 ft 0 in)	59.8 m (196 ft 2 in)	60.4 m (198 ft 2 in)
Beam overall	5.85 m (19 ft 2 in)	6.20 m (20 ft 4 in)	6.20 m (20 ft 4 in)	6.20 m (20 ft 4 in)	6.85 m (22 ft 6 in)	6.28 m (20 ft 7 in)	7.3 m (23 ft 11 in)
Beam pressure hull	4.70 m (15 ft 5 in)	4.70 m (15 ft 5 in)	4.70 m (15 ft 5 in)	4.70 m (15 ft 5 in)	5.0 m (16 ft 5 in)	4.70 m (15 ft 5 in)	4.70 m (15 ft 5 in)
Draft	4.37 m (14 ft 4 in)	4.74 m (15 ft 7 in)	4.74 m (15 ft 7 in)	4.74 m (15 ft 7 in)	5.0 m (16 ft 5 in)	5.01 m (16 ft 5 in)	4.91 m (16 ft 1 in)
Fuel	67 t (66 long tons)	108 t (106 long tons)	113 t (111 long tons)	113 t (111 long tons)	159 t (156 long tons)	169 t (166 long tons)	199 t (196 long tons)
Power surfaced (diesel)	2,300 hp (1,700 kW)	2,800 hp (2,100 kW) or 3,200 hp (2,400 kW)					
Power submerged (electric)	750 hp (560 kW)						
Surface speed	16 kn (30 km/h; 18 mph)	17.9 kn (33.2 km/h; 20.6 mph)	17.7 kn (32.8 km/h; 20.4 mph)	17.7 kn (32.8 km/h; 20.4 mph)	18.6 kn (34.4 km/h; 21.4 mph)	16.7 kn (30.9 km/h; 19.2 mph)	17.6 kn (32.6 km/h; 20.3 mph)
Submerged speed	8 kn (15 km/h; 9.2 mph)	8 kn (15 km/h; 9.2 mph)	7.6 kn (14.1 km/h; 8.7 mph)	7.6 kn (14.1 km/h; 8.7 mph)	7.6 kn (14.1 km/h; 8.7 mph)	7.3 kn (13.5 km/h; 8.4 mph)	7.6 kn (14.1 km/h; 8.7 mph)
Surface range at 10 knots	6,200 nmi (11,500 km; 7,100 mi)	8,700 nmi (16,100 km; 10,000 mi)	8,500 nmi (15,700 km; 9,800 mi)	8,500 nmi (15,700 km; 9,800 mi)	12,600 nmi (23,300 km; 14,500 mi)	11,200 nmi (20,700 km; 12,900 mi)	14,700 nmi (27,200 km; 16,900 mi)
Submerged range at 4 knots	74–94 nmi (137–174 km; 85–108 mi)	90 nmi (170 km; 100 mi)	80 nmi (150 km; 92 mi)	80 nmi (150 km; 92 mi)	80 nmi (150 km; 92 mi)	69 nmi (128 km; 79 mi)	75 nmi (139 km; 86 mi)
Construction diving depth (Note: German U-boat construction used a safety factor of 2.5, which meant that crush diving depth was 2.5 times construction diving depth. Test diving depth was 60% of crush diving depth.)	100 m (328 ft 1 in)	100 m (328 ft 1 in)	100 m (328 ft 1 in)	120 m (393 ft 8 in)	200 m (656 ft 2 in)	100 m (328 ft 1 in)	100 m (328 ft 1 in)
Test diving depth	150 m (492 ft 2 in)	150 m (492 ft 2 in)	150 m (492 ft 2 in)	180 m (590 ft 7 in)	300 m (984 ft 3 in)	150 m (492 ft 2 in)	150 m (492 ft 2 in)
Crush diving depth	250 m (820 ft 3 in)	250 m (820 ft 3 in)	250 m (820 ft 3 in)	300 m (984 ft 3 in)	500 m (1,640 ft 5 in)	250 m (820 ft 3 in)	250 m (820 ft 3 in)
Complement	42–46	44–48	44–52	44–52	44–52	46–52	46–52
Deck gun	8.8 cm SK C/35						none
Anti-aircraft guns	1 × 2 cm C/30					2 × 2 cm Flak C/30	1 × 3.7 cm, 2 × C/38 2 cm
Bow/stern tubes	4/1						
Torpedoes (maximum)	11	14	14	14	16	14	36
Mines	22 TMA mines or 33 TMB mines	26 TMA mines or 39 TMB mines				id. VIIC, plus 15 SMA mines	none

== See also ==
Equivalent submarines of the same era

- O 21 class
- Aurore class
- Brin class
- Orzeł class
- Mackerel class
- S class
