= List of German U-boats in World War II (600-4712) =

The German military submarines known as U-boats that were in action during World War II were built between 1935 and 1945, and were numbered in sequence from U-1 upwards. Numbering was according to the sequence in which construction orders were allocated to the individual shipyards, rather than commissioning date; thus some boats carrying high numbers were commissioned well before boats with lower numbers. Later in the war, whole contracts for older designs were sometimes cancelled in favour of newer designs, with the numbers allocated being reused later.

The U-boat fleet sank large tonnages of Allied shipping, both warships and merchant ships. Most of the U-boats were ultimately lost in combat or were scuttled.

				Warships (Including auxiliaries)				Merchant Ships						Fate		
				Sunk & Total Loss		Damaged		Sunk		Damaged		Total Loss		Fate		
Name		Type	Notable Commanders	No.	Tons & GRT	No.	Tons & GRT	No.	GRT	No.	GRT	No.	GRT	Event	Date	Notes
U-600	1941	VIIC		0	0	0	0	5	28,600	3	19,230	0	0	Sunk	25 November 1943	HMS Bazely and HMS Blackwood
U-601	1941	VIIC		0	0	0	0	4	8,869	0	0	0	0	Sunk	25 February 1944	RAF Catalina
U-602	1941	VIIC		1	1,540	0	0	0	0	0	0	0	0	Missing	19 April 1943	
U-603	1941	VIIC		0	0	0	0	4	22,406	0	0	0	0	Missing	19 February 1944	
U-604	1941	VIIC	Horst Höltring	0	0	0	0	6	39,891	0	0	0	0	Scuttled	11 August 1943	Depth charged by a Ventura & Liberator
U-605	1941	VIIC		0	0	0	0	3	8,409	0	0	0	0	Sunk	14 November 1942	RAF Hudson
U-606	1941	VIIC	Hans-Heinrich Döhler	0	0	0	0	3	20,527	2	21,925	0	0	Sunk	22 February 1943	USCGC Campbell & Polish destroyer ORP Burza
U-607	1941	VIIC	Ernst Mengersen	0	0	0	0	4	28,937	2	15,201	0	0	Sunk	13 July 1943	RAF Sunderland
U-608	1941	VIIC		1	291	0	0	4	35,539	0	0	0	0	Scuttled	10 August 1944	RAF Liberator
U-609	1941	VIIC		0	0	0	0	2	10,288	0	0	0	0	Sunk	6 February 1943	FFNF Lobelia
U-610	1941	VIIC		0	0	0	0	4	21,273	1	9,551	0	0	Sunk	8 October 1943	RCAF Sunderland
U-611	1942	VIIC		0	0	0	0	0	0	0	0	0	0	Sunk	8 December 1942	RAF Liberator
U-612	1942	VIIC	Herbert Werner	0	0	0	0	0	0	0	0	0	0	Scuttled	1 May 1945	Had been previously sunk then raised
U-613	1942	VIIC		0	0	0	0	2	8,087	0	0	0	0	Sunk	23 July 1943	USS George E. Badger
U-614	1942	VIIC		0	0	0	0	1	5,730	0	0	0	0	Sunk	29 July 1943	RAF Wellington
U-615	1942	VIIC		0	0	0	0	4	27,231	0	0	0	0	Sunk	7 August 1943	US Mariner & Ventura aircraft
U-616	1942	VIIC	Siegfried Koitschka	2	2,181	0	0	0	0	2	17,754	0	0	Sunk	17 May 1944	USS Nields, USS Gleaves, USS Ellyson, USS Macomb, USS Hambleton, USS Rodman, USS Emmons and RAF Wellington
U-617	1942	VIIC	Albrecht Brandi, Günther Heydemann	3	4,510	0	0	8	25,879	0	0	0	0	Ran aground & destroyed	12 September 1943	RAF Hudson, RN Swordfish, HMS Hyacinth and HMAS Wollongong
U-618	1942	VIIC		0	0	0	0	3	15,788	0	0	0	0	Sunk	14 August 1944	HMS Duckworth, HMS Essington and RAF Liberator
U-619	1942	VIIC		0	0	0	0	2	8,723	0	0	0	0	Sunk	5 October 1942	RAF Hudson aircraft
U-620	1942	VIIC		0	0	0	0	1	6,983	0	0	0	0	Sunk	13 February 1943	RAF Catalina
U-621	1942	VIIC	Hermann Stuckmann	1	2,938	1	1,625	4	20,159	1	10,048	0	0	Sunk	18 August 1944	HMCS Ottawa, HMCS Kootenay and HMCS Chaudiere
U-622	1942	VIIC		0	0	0	0	0	0	0	0	0	0	Sunk	24 July 1943	US air raid
U-623	1942	VIIC		0	0	0	0	0	0	0	0	0	0	Sunk	21 February 1943	RAF Liberator
U-624	1942	VIIC		3	873	0	0	5	39,855	1	5,432	0	0	Sunk	7 February 1943	RAF Liberator
U-625	1942	VIIC		2	1,129	0	0	3	18,751	0	0	0	0	Sunk	10 March 1944	RCAF Sunderland
U-626	1942	VIIC		0	0	0	0	0	0	0	0	0	0	Missing	14 December 1942	
U-627	1942	VIIC		0	0	0	0	0	0	0	0	0	0	Sunk	27 October 1942	RAF Fortress
U-628	1942	VIIC		0	0	0	0	4	21,765	3	20,450	0	0	Sunk	3 July 1943	RAF Liberator
U-629	1942	VIIC		0	0	0	0	0	0	0	0	0	0	Sunk	7 June 1944	RAF Liberator
U-630	1942	VIIC		0	0	0	0	2	14,894	0	0	0	0	Sunk	6 May 1943	HMS Vidette
U-631	1942	VIIC		0	0	0	0	2	9,136	0	0	0	0	Sunk	17 October 1943	HMS Sunflower
U-632	1942	VIIC		0	0	0	0	2	15,255	0	0	0	0	Sunk	6 April 1943	RAF Liberator
U-633	1942	VIIC		0	0	0	0	1	3,921	0	0	0	0	Sunk	8 March 1943	USCGC Spencer
U-634	1942	VIIC		0	0	0	0	1	7,176	0	0	0	0	Sunk	30 August 1943	HMS Stork & HMS Stonecrop
U-635	1942	VIIC		0	0	0	0	0	0	2	14,894	0	0	Sunk	5 April 1943	RAF Liberator
U-636	1942	VIIC		0	0	0	0	1	7,169	0	0	0	0	Sunk	21 April 1945	HMS Bazely, HMS Drury and HMS Bentinck
U-637	1942	VIIC		1	39	0	0	0	0	0	0	0	0	Surrendered	9 May 1945	Operation Deadlight
U-638	1942	VIIC		0	0	0	0	1	5,507	1	6,537	0	0	Sunk	5 May 1943	HMS Sunflower
U-639	1942	VIIC		0	0	0	0	0	0	0	0	0	0	Sunk	28 August 1943	Soviet sub S-101
U-640	1942	VIIC		0	0	0	0	0	0	0	0	0	0	Sunk	14 May 1943	US Catalina
U-641	1942	VIIC		0	0	0	0	0	0	0	0	0	0	Sunk	19 January 1944	HMS Violet
U-642	1942	VIIC		0	0	0	0	1	2,125	0	0	0	0	Sunk	5 July 1944	US air raid
U-643	1942	VIIC		0	0	0	0	0	0	0	0	0	0	Scuttled	8 October 1943	RAF Liberator
U-644	1942	VIIC		0	0	0	0	0	0	0	0	0	0	Sunk	7 April 1943	British sub HMS Tuna
U-645	1942	VIIC		0	0	0	0	2	12,788	0	0	0	0	Missing	12 December 1943	
U-646	1942	VIIC		0	0	0	0	0	0	0	0	0	0	Sunk	17 May 1943	RAF Hudson
U-647	1942	VIIC		0	0	0	0	0	0	0	0	0	0	Missing	28 July 1943	Probably struck a mine
U-648	1942	VIIC		0	0	0	0	0	0	0	0	0	0	Missing	22 November 1943	
U-649	1942	VIIC		0	0	0	0	0	0	0	0	0	0	Sunk	24 February 1943	Collision with U-232
U-650	1942	VIIC		0	0	0	0	0	0	0	0	0	0	Sunk	7 January 1945	Unidentified Allied vessel using a Hedgehog anti-submarine weapon
U-651	1940	VIIC		0	0	0	0	2	11,639	0	0	0	0	Sunk	29 June 1941	HMS Malcolm, HMS Scimitar, HMS Arabis, HMS Violet and HMS Speedwell
U-652	1941	VIIC	Georg-Werner Fraatz	3	3,298	1	10,917	3	10,775	2	9,918	0	0	Scuttled	2 June 1942	Depth charge damage
U-653	1941	VIIC		1	840	0	0	3	14,983	1	9,382	0	0	Sunk	15 March 1944	Fleet Air Arm Swordfish, HMS Starling and HMS Wild Goose
U-654	1941	VIIC		1	900	0	0	3	17,755	0	0	0	0	Sunk	22 August 1942	US Douglas Digby aircraft
U-655	1941	VIIC		0	0	0	0	0	0	0	0	0	0	Sunk	24 March 1942	HMS Sharpshooter
U-656	1941	VIIC		0	0	0	0	0	0	0	0	0	0	Sunk	1 March 1942	US Hudson
U-657	1941	VIIC		0	0	0	0	1	5,196	0	0	0	0	Sunk	17 May 1943	HMS Swale
U-658	1941	VIIC		0	0	0	0	3	12,146	1	6,466	0	0	Sunk	30 October 1942	RCAF Hudson
U-659	1941	VIIC		0	0	0	0	1	7,519	3	21,565	0	0	Sunk	4 May 1943	Collision with U-439
U-660	1941	VIIC		0	0	0	0	2	10,066	2	10,447	0	0	Sunk	12 November 1942	HMS Lotus and HMS Starwort
U-661	1941	VIIC		0	0	0	0	1	3,672	0	0	0	0	Sunk	15 October 1942	HMS Viscount
U-662	1942	VIIC		0	0	0	0	3	18,609	1	7,174	0	0	Sunk	21 July 1943	US Catalina
U-663	1942	VIIC		0	0	0	0	2	10,924	0	0	0	0	Sunk	8 May 1943	RAAF Sunderland
U-664	1942	VIIC		0	0	0	0	3	19,325	0	0	0	0	Sunk	9 August 1943	USN Grumman Avenger aircraft
U-665	1942	VIIC		0	0	0	0	1	7,134	0	0	0	0	Missing	22 March 1943	
U-666	1942	VIIC		1	1,370	0	0	0	0	1	5,234	0	0	Sunk	10 February 1944	
U-667	1942	VIIC	Heinrich Schroeteler	3	2,824	0	0	1	7,176	0	0	0	0	Sunk	26 August 1944	Struck a mine
U-668	1942	VIIC		0	0	0	0	0	0	0	0	0	0	Surrendered	9 May 1945	Operation Deadlight
U-669	1942	VIIC		0	0	0	0	0	0	0	0	0	0	Missing	30 August 1943	
U-670	1942	VIIC		0	0	0	0	0	0	0	0	0	0	Sunk	20 August 1943	Collision accident with Kriegsmarine ship Bolkoburg
U-671	1942	VIIC		0	0	0	0	0	0	0	0	0	0	Sunk	4 August 1944	HMS Stayner & HMS Wensleydale
U-672	1943	VIIC		0	0	0	0	0	0	0	0	0	0	Scuttled	18 July 1944	HMS Balfour
U-673	1943	VIIC		0	0	0	0	0	0	0	0	0	0	Sunk	24 October 1944	Collision accident with U-382
U-674	1943	VIIC		0	0	0	0	0	0	0	0	0	0	Sunk	2 May 1944	RN Swordfish
U-675	1943	VIIC		0	0	0	0	0	0	0	0	0	0	Sunk	24 May 1944	RAF Sunderland
U-676	1943	VIIC		0	0	0	0	0	0	0	0	0	0	Sunk	12 February 1945	Struck a mine
U-677	1943	VIIC		0	0	0	0	0	0	0	0	0	0	Sunk	9 April 1945	Air raid
U-678	1943	VIIC		0	0	0	0	0	0	0	0	0	0	Sunk	6 July 1944	HMCS Ottawa, HMCS Kootenay and HMS Statice
U-679	1943	VIIC		1	39	1	36	0	0	0	0	0	0	Sunk	9 January 1945	Soviet Navy anti-submarine vessel MO-124
U-680	1943	VIIC		0	0	0	0	0	0	0	0	0	0	Sunk	5 May 1945	Operation Deadlight
U-681	1943	VIIC		0	0	0	0	0	0	0	0	0	0	Sunk	11 March 1945	US Liberator
U-682	1944	VIIC		0	0	0	0	0	0	0	0	0	0	Destroyed	11 March 1945	Air raid
U-683	1944	VIIC		0	0	0	0	0	0	0	0	0	0	Missing	20 February 1945	
U-701	1941	VIIC		4	1,666	1	1,190	5	25,390	4	37,093	0	0	Sunk	7 July 1942	USAAF Hudson
U-702	1941	VIIC		0	0	0	0	0	0	0	0	0	0	Sunk	31 March 1942	Struck a mine
U-703	1941	VIIC		2	2,429	0	0	5	29,523	0	0	0	0	Missing	16 September 1944	Possibly sank in bad weather
U-704	1941	VIIC		0	0	0	0	1	6,942	0	0	0	0	Scuttled	30 April 1945	
U-705	1941	VIIC		0	0	0	0	1	3,279	0	0	0	0	Sunk	3 September 1942	RAF Whitley depth charges
U-706	1941	VIIC		0	0	0	0	3	18,650	0	0	0	0	Sunk	2 August 1943	RCAF Hampden & US Liberator aircraft
U-707	1941	VIIC		0	0	0	0	2	11,811	0	0	0	0	Sunk	9 November 1943	RAF Fortress
U-708	1941	VIIC		0	0	0	0	0	0	0	0	0	0	Scuttled	5 May 1945	
U-709	1942	VIIC		0	0	0	0	0	0	0	0	0	0	Missing	19 February 1944	
U-710	1942	VIIC		0	0	0	0	0	0	0	0	0	0	Sunk	24 April 1943	RAF Fortress
U-711	1942	VIIC	Hans-Günther Lange	1	925	1	20	1	10	0	0	0	0	Sunk	4 May 1945	RN Grumman Avenger aircraft, HMS Trumpeter and HMS Queen
U-712	1942	VIIC		0	0	0	0	0	0	0	0	0	0	Surrendered	9 May 1945	Used by RN post-war. Broken up 1950
U-713	1942	VIIC		0	0	0	0	0	0	0	0	0	0	Missing	24 February 1944	
U-714	1942	VIIC		1	425	0	0	1	1,226	0	0	0	0	Sunk	14 March 1945	HMS Wivern and HMSAS Natal
U-715	1942	VIIC		0	0	0	0	0	0	0	0	0	0	Sunk	13 June 1944	Canadian Catalina
U-716	1943	VIIC		1	54	0	0	1	7,200	0	0	0	0	Surrendered	9 May 1945	Operation Deadlight
U-717	1943	VIIC		0	0	0	0	0	0	0	0	0	0	Scuttled	5 May 1945	
U-718	1943	VIIC		0	0	0	0	0	0	0	0	0	0	Sunk	18 November 1943	Collision with U-476
U-719	1943	VIIC		0	0	0	0	0	0	0	0	0	0	Sunk	26 June 1944	HMS Bulldog
U-720	1943	VIIC		0	0	0	0	0	0	0	0	0	0	Surrendered	5 May 1945	Operation Deadlight
U-721	1943	VIIC		0	0	0	0	0	0	0	0	0	0	Scuttled	5 May 1945	
U-722	1943	VIIC		0	0	0	0	1	2,190	0	0	0	0	Sunk	27 March 1945	HMS Fitzroy, HMS Redmill and HMS Byron
U-731	1942	VIIC		0	0	0	0	0	0	0	0	0	0	Sunk	15 May 1944	HMS Kilmarnock, HMS Blackfly, US Catalina
U-732	1942	VIIC		0	0	0	0	0	0	0	0	0	0	Scuttled	31 October 1943	HMS Douglas and HMS Imperialist
U-733	1942	VIIC		0	0	0	0	0	0	0	0	0	0	Scuttled	5 May 1945	Bomb damage
U-734	1942	VIIC		0	0	0	0	0	0	0	0	0	0	Sunk	9 February 1944	HMS Wild Goose & HMS Starling
U-735	1942	VIIC		0	0	0	0	0	0	0	0	0	0	Sunk	28 December 1944	Air raid
U-736	1942	VIIC		0	0	0	0	0	0	0	0	0	0	Sunk	6 August 1944	HMS Loch Killin
U-737	1942	VIIC	Paul Brasack	0	0	0	0	0	0	0	0	0	0	Sunk	19 December 1944	Collision with MRS 25
U-738	1942	VIIC		0	0	0	0	0	0	0	0	0	0	Sunk	14 February 1944	Collision with steamship Erna
U-739	1942	VIIC		1	625	0	0	0	0	0	0	0	0	Surrendered	13 May 1945	Operation Deadlight
U-740	1942	VIIC		0	0	0	0	0	0	0	0	0	0	Sunk	8 June 1944	
U-741	1943	VIIC		1	1,625	0	0	0	0	0	0	0	0	Sunk	15 August 1944	HMS Orchis
U-742	1943	VIIC		0	0	0	0	0	0	0	0	0	0	Sunk	18 July 1944	RAF Catalina
U-743	1943	VIIC		0	0	0	0	0	0	0	0	0	0	Missing	22 August 1944	
U-744	1943	VIIC		1	1,625	0	0	1	7,359	0	0	0	0	Sunk	6 March 1944	HMS Icarus, HMS Kenilworth Castle, HMCS St. Catharines, HMCS Fennel, HMCS Chilliwack and HMCS Chaudiere
U-745	1943	VIIC		2	740	0	0	0	0	0	0	0	0	Sunk	31 January 1945	Struck a mine
U-746	1943	VIIC		0	0	0	0	0	0	0	0	0	0	Scuttled	5 May 1945	Air raid
U-747	1943	VIIC		0	0	0	0	0	0	0	0	0	0	Scuttled	5 May 1945	Air raid
U-748	1943	VIIC		0	0	0	0	0	0	0	0	0	0	Scuttled	5 May 1945	
U-749	1943	VIIC		0	0	0	0	0	0	0	0	0	0	Sunk	4 April 1945	Air raid
U-750	1943	VIIC		0	0	0	0	0	0	0	0	0	0	Scuttled	5 May 1945	
U-751	1940	VIIC	Gerhard Bigalk, Hans-Heinrich Döhler	1	11,000	0	0	5	21,412	1	8,096	0	0	Sunk	17 July 1942	RAF Lancaster and Whitley
U-752	1941	VIIC	Karl-Ernst Schroeter	2	1,134	0	0	7	32,966	1	4,799	0	0	Scuttled	23 May 1943	RN Swordfish rocket attack
U-753	1941	VIIC		0	0	0	0	3	23,117	2	6,908	0	0	Sunk	13 May 1943	HMS Lagan
U-754	1941	VIIC		0	0	0	0	13	55,659	1	490	0	0	Sunk	31 July 1942	RCAF Hudson
U-755	1941	VIIC		2	2,974	0	0	1	928	0	0	0	0	Sunk	28 May 1943	RAF Hudson
U-756	1941	VIIC		0	0	0	0	0	0	0	0	0	0	Sunk	1 September 1942	HMCS Morden
U-757	1941	VIIC		1	291	0	0	2	11,313	0	0	0	0	Sunk	8 January 1944	HMS Bayntun and HMCS Camrose
U-758	1942	VIIC	Gerhard Bigalk	0	0	0	0	2	13,989	0	0	0	0	Stricken	16 March 1945	Air raid
U-759	1942	VIIC		0	0	0	0	2	12,764	0	0	0	0	Sunk	15 July 1943	USN Mariner
U-760	1942	VIIC		0	0	0	0	0	0	0	0	0	0	Interned	8 September 1943	Operation Deadlight
U-761	1942	VIIC		0	0	0	0	0	0	0	0	0	0	Scuttled	24 February 1944	HMS Anthony & HMS Wishart
U-762	1942	VIIC		0	0	0	0	0	0	0	0	0	0	Sunk	8 February 1944	HMS Wild Goose & HMS Woodpecker
U-763	1943	VIIC		0	0	0	0	1	1,927	0	0	0	0	Scuttled	29 January 1945	Air raid
U-764	1943	VIIC		2	1,696	0	0	1	638	0	0	0	0	Surrendered	14 May 1945	Operation Deadlight
U-765	1943	VIIC		0	0	0	0	0	0	0	0	0	0	Sunk	6 May 1944	Fairey Swordfish, Aylmer, Bligh and Bickerton
U-766	1943	VIIC		0	0	0	0	0	0	0	0	0	0	Stricken	24 August 1944	Became French sub Laubie
U-767	1943	VIIC		1	1,370	0	0	0	0	0	0	0	0	Sunk	18 June 1944	HMS Fame, HMS Inconstant & HMS Havelock
U-768	1943	VIIC		0	0	0	0	0	0	0	0	0	0	Sunk	20 November 1943	Collision with U-745
U-771	1943	VIIC		0	0	0	0	0	0	0	0	0	0	Sunk	11 November 1944	British sub HMS Venturer
U-772	1943	VIIC		0	0	0	0	0	0	0	0	0	0	Sunk	17 December 1944	HMS Nyasaland
U-773	1943	VIIC		0	0	0	0	0	0	0	0	0	0	Surrendered	9 May 1945	Operation Deadlight
U-774	1943	VIIC		0	0	0	0	0	0	0	0	0	0	Sunk	8 April 1945	HMS Calder & HMS Bentinck
U-775	1943	VIIC		1	1,300	0	0	1	1,926	1	6,991	0	0	Surrendered	9 May 1945	Operation Deadlight
U-776	1944	VIIC		0	0	0	0	0	0	0	0	0	0	Surrendered	16 May 1945	Operation Deadlight
U-777	1944	VIIC		0	0	0	0	0	0	0	0	0	0	Sunk	15 October 1944	Air raid
U-778	1944	VIIC		0	0	0	0	0	0	0	0	0	0	Surrendered	9 May 1945	Operation Deadlight
U-779	1944	VIIC		0	0	0	0	0	0	0	0	0	0	Surrendered	5 May 1945	Operation Deadlight
U-792	1943	XVIIA		0	0	0	0	0	0	0	0	0	0	Scuttled	4 May 1945	Used for trials
U-793	1944	XVIIA		0	0	0	0	0	0	0	0	0	0	Scuttled	4 May 1945	Used for trials
U-794	1943	XVIIA		0	0	0	0	0	0	0	0	0	0	Scuttled	5 May 1945	Used for trials
U-795	1944	XVIIA		0	0	0	0	0	0	0	0	0	0	Scuttled	3 May 1945	Used for trials
U-801	1942	IXC/40		0	0	0	0	0	0	0	0	0	0	Scuttled	17 March 1944	USN Avenger aircraft and USS Corry and USS Bronstein
U-802	1942	IXC/40		0	0	0	0	1	1,621	0	0	0	0	Surrendered	11 May 1945	Operation Deadlight
U-803	1943	IXC/40		0	0	0	0	0	0	0	0	0	0	Sunk	27 April 1944	Struck a mine
U-804	1943	IXC/40		1	1,300	0	0	0	0	0	0	0	0	Sunk	9 April 1945	RAF Mosquito
U-805	1943	IXC/40		0	0	0	0	0	0	0	0	0	0	Surrendered	15 May 1945	Sunk post-war
U-806	1943	IXC/40		1	672	0	0	0	0	1	7,219	0	0	Surrendered	6 May 1945	Operation Deadlight
U-821	1943	VIIC		0	0	0	0	0	0	0	0	0	0	Sunk	10 June 1944	RAF Liberator
U-822	1944	VIIC		0	0	0	0	0	0	0	0	0	0	Scuttled	5 May 1945	
U-825	1944	VIIC		0	0	0	0	0	0	1	7,198	1	8,262	Surrendered	13 May 1945	Operation Deadlight
U-826	1944	VIIC		0	0	0	0	0	0	0	0	0	0	Surrendered	11 May 1945	Operation Deadlight
U-827	1944	VIIC/41		0	0	0	0	0	0	0	0	0	0	Scuttled	5 May 1945	
U-828	1944	VIIC/41		0	0	0	0	0	0	0	0	0	0	Scuttled	5 May 1945	
U-841	1942	IXC/40		0	0	0	0	0	0	0	0	0	0	Scuttled	17 October 1943	HMS Byard
U-842	1942	IXC/40		0	0	0	0	0	0	0	0	0	0	Sunk	6 November 1943	HMS Wild Goose & HMS Starling
U-843	1942	IXC/40		0	0	0	0	1	8,261	0	0	0	0	Sunk	9 April 1945	RAF Mosquito
U-844	1942	IXC/40		0	0	0	0	0	0	0	0	0	0	Sunk	16 October 1943	RAF Liberator
U-845	1943	IXC/40		0	0	0	0	0	0	1	7,039	0	0	Sunk	10 March 1944	HMS Forester, HMCS St. Laurent, HMCS Owen Sound and HMCS Swansea
U-846	1943	IXC/40		0	0	0	0	0	0	0	0	0	0	Sunk	4 May 1944	RCAF Wellington
U-847	1942	IXD2	Friedrich Guggenberger, Wilhelm Rollmann, Jost Metzler, Herbert Kuppisch	0	0	0	0	0	0	0	0	0	0	Sunk	27 August 1943	US Avenger and Wildcat aircraft
U-848	1942	IXD2	Wilhelm Rollmann	0	0	0	0	1	4,573	0	0	0	0	Sunk	5 November 1943	US Liberators & Mitchell aircraft
U-849	1942	IXD2	Heinz-Otto Schultze	0	0	0	0	0	0	0	0	0	0	Sunk	25 November 1943	US Liberator
U-850	1942	IXD2	Klaus Ewerth	0	0	0	0	0	0	0	0	0	0	Sunk	20 December 1943	USN Avenger and Wildcat aircraft
U-851	1943	IXD2		0	0	0	0	0	0	0	0	0	0	Missing	27 March 1944	
U-852	1943	IXD2	Heinz-Wilhelm Eck	0	0	0	0	2	9,972	0	0	0	0	Scuttled	3 May 1944	RAF Wellington
U-853	1943	IXC/40	Günter Kuhnke	1	430	0	0	1	5,353	0	0	0	0	Sunk	6 May 1945	USS Ericsson, USS Amick, USS Atherton, and USS Moberly
U-854	1943	IXC/40		0	0	0	0	0	0	0	0	0	0	Sunk	4 February 1944	Struck a mine
U-855	1943	IXC/40		0	0	0	0	0	0	0	0	0	0	Missing	11 September 1944	Probably struck a mine
U-856	1943	IXC/40		0	0	0	0	0	0	0	0	0	0	Scuttled	7 April 1944	USS Champlin & USS Huse
U-857	1943	IXC/40		0	0	0	0	2	15,259	1	6,825	0	0	Missing	30 April 1945	Unexplained loss
U-858	1943	IXC/40		0	0	0	0	0	0	0	0	0	0	Surrendered	14 May 1945	
U-859	1943	IXD2		0	0	0	0	3	20,853	0	0	0	0	Sunk	23 September 1944	HMS Trenchant
U-860	1943	IXD2		0	0	0	0	0	0	0	0	0	0	Sunk	15 June 1944	USN Avenger and Wildcat aircraft
U-861	1943	IXD2	Jürgen Oesten	1	1,737	0	0	3	20,311	1	8,139	0	0	Surrendered	9 May 1945	Operation Deadlight
U-862	1943	IXD2	Heinrich Timm	0	0	0	0	7	42,374	0	0	0	0	Scuttled	15 February 1946	Became Japanese sub I-502
U-863	1943	IXD2		0	0	0	0	0	0	0	0	0	0	Sunk	29 September 1944	US Liberator
U-864	1943	IXD2		0	0	0	0	0	0	0	0	0	0	Sunk	9 February 1945	HMS Venturer
U-865	1943	IXC/40		0	0	0	0	0	0	0	0	0	0	Missing	9 September 1944	
U-866	1943	IXC/40		0	0	0	0	0	0	0	0	0	0	Sunk	18 March 1945	USS Lowe, USS Menges, USS Mosley, and USS Pride
U-867	1943	IXC/40		0	0	0	0	0	0	0	0	0	0	Scuttled	19 September 1944	RAF Liberator
U-868	1943	IXC/40		1	672	0	0	0	0	0	0	0	0	Surrendered	9 May 1945	Operation Deadlight
U-869	1943	IXC/40		0	0	0	0	0	0	0	0	0	0	Sunk	11 February 1945	USS Howard D. Crow and USS Koiner
U-870	1943	IXC/40	Ernst Hechler	2	1,960	1	1,400	0	0	0	0	2	11,844	Sunk	30 March 1945	Air raid
U-871	1943	IXD2		0	0	0	0	0	0	0	0	0	0	Sunk	26 September 1944	RAF Fortress
U-872	1943	IXD2		0	0	0	0	0	0	0	0	0	0	Broken up	29 July 1944	Bomb damage
U-873	1943	IXD2		0	0	0	0	0	0	0	0	0	0	Surrendered	16 May 1945	Sold for scrap
U-874	1943	IXD2		0	0	0	0	0	0	0	0	0	0	Surrendered	9 May 1945	Operation Deadlight
U-875	1943	IXD2		0	0	0	0	0	0	0	0	0	0	Surrendered	9 May 1945	Operation Deadlight
U-876	1944	IXD2		0	0	0	0	0	0	0	0	0	0	Scuttled	3 May 1945	Bomb damage
U-877	1943	IXC/40		0	0	0	0	0	0	0	0	0	0	Sunk	27 December 1944	HMCS St. Thomas
U-878	1944	IXC/40		0	0	0	0	0	0	0	0	0	0	Sunk	10 April 1945	HMS Vanquisher & HMS Tintagel Castle
U-879	1944	IXC/40		0	0	0	0	0	0	1	8,537	0	0	Sunk	30 April 1945	USS Natchez, USS Coffman, USS Bostwick and USS Thomas
U-880	1944	IXC/40		0	0	0	0	0	0	0	0	0	0	Sunk	16 April 1945	USS Stanton and USS Frost
U-881	1944	IXC/40		0	0	0	0	0	0	0	0	0	0	Sunk	6 May 1945	USS Farquhar
U-883	1944	IXD/42		0	0	0	0	0	0	0	0	0	0	Surrendered	5 May 1945	Operation Deadlight
U-889	1944	IXC/40		0	0	0	0	0	0	0	0	0	0	Surrendered	13 May 1945	Transferred to US Navy
U-901	1943	VIIC		0	0	0	0	0	0	0	0	0	0	Surrendered	15 May 1945	Stavanger, Norway
U-903	1943	VIIC		0	0	0	0	0	0	0	0	0	0	Scuttled	5 May 1945	
U-904	1943	VIIC		0	0	0	0	0	0	0	0	0	0	Scuttled	4 May 1945	
U-905	1943	VIIC		0	0	0	0	0	0	0	0	0	0	Sunk	27 March 1945	HMS Conn
U-907	1944	VIIC		0	0	0	0	0	0	0	0	0	0	Surrendered	9 May 1945	Operation Deadlight
U-921	1943	VIIC		0	0	0	0	0	0	0	0	0	0	Missing	24 September 1944	
U-922	1943	VIIC		0	0	0	0	0	0	0	0	0	0	Scuttled	3 May 1945	
U-923	1943	VIIC		0	0	0	0	0	0	0	0	0	0	Sunk	9 February 1945	Struck a mine
U-924	1943	VIIC		0	0	0	0	0	0	0	0	0	0	Scuttled	3 May 1945	
U-925	1943	VIIC		0	0	0	0	0	0	0	0	0	0	Missing	25 August 1944	
U-926	1943	VIIC		0	0	0	0	0	0	0	0	0	0	Surrendered	9 May 1945	Became Norwegian sub HNoMS Kya
U-927	1944	VIIC		0	0	0	0	0	0	0	0	0	0	Sunk	24 February 1945	RAF Warwick
U-928	1944	VIIC		0	0	0	0	0	0	0	0	0	0	Surrendered	9 May 1945	Operation Deadlight
U-929	1944	VIIC/41		0	0	0	0	0	0	0	0	0	0	Scuttled	1 May 1945	
U-930	1944	VIIC/41		0	0	0	0	0	0	0	0	0	0	Surrendered	9 May 1945	Operation Deadlight
U-951	1942	VIIC		0	0	0	0	0	0	0	0	0	0	Sunk	7 July 1943	US Liberator
U-952	1942	VIIC		1	925	0	0	2	13,374	1	7,176	0	0	Broken up	1946	
U-953	1942	VIIC	Karl-Heinz Marbach	0	0	0	0	0	0	0	0	0	0	Surrendered	9 May 1945	Used by RN for trials
U-954	1942	VIIC		0	0	0	0	0	0	0	0	0	0	Sunk	19 May 1943	HMS Sennen and HMS Jed
U-955	1942	VIIC		0	0	0	0	0	0	0	0	0	0	Sunk	7 June 1944	RAF Sunderland
U-956	1942	VIIC		1	1,190	0	0	0	0	0	0	1	7,176	Surrendered	13 May 1945	Operation Deadlight
U-957	1942	VIIC	Gerhard Schaar	2	604	0	0	2	7,564	0	0	0	0	Stricken	21 October 1944	
U-958	1942	VIIC		1	720	0	0	1	40	1	40	0	0	Scuttled	3 May 1945	
U-959	1942	VIIC		0	0	0	0	0	0	0	0	0	0	Sunk	2 May 1944	RN Swordfish
U-960	1942	VIIC		1	611	0	0	2	9,656	0	0	0	0	Sunk	19 May 1944	USS Niblack, USS Ludlow with both Wellington and Ventura aircraft
U-961	1942	VIIC		0	0	0	0	0	0	0	0	0	0	Sunk	29 March 1944	HMS Starling
U-962	1942	VIIC		0	0	0	0	0	0	0	0	0	0	Sunk	8 April 1944	HMS Crane and HMS Cygnet
U-963	1942	VIIC		0	0	0	0	0	0	0	0	0	0	Scuttled	20 May 1945	Crew interned in Portugal
U-964	1942	VIIC		0	0	0	0	0	0	0	0	0	0	Sunk	16 October 1943	RAF Liberator
U-965	1943	VIIC		0	0	0	0	0	0	0	0	0	0	Sunk	30 March 1945	HMS Rupert & HMS Conn
U-966	1943	VIIC		0	0	0	0	0	0	0	0	0	0	Sunk	10 November 1943	RAF Wellington & US Liberator
U-967	1943	VIIC	Albrecht Brandi	1	1,300	0	0	0	0	0	0	0	0	Scuttled	19 August 1944	
U-968	1943	VIIC	Otto Westphalen	2	2,700	0	0	2	14,386	1	8,129	1	7,200	Surrendered	9 May 1945	Operation Deadlight
U-969	1943	VIIC		0	0	0	0	0	0	0	0	2	14,352	Sunk	6 August 1944	US Liberator
U-970	1943	VIIC		0	0	0	0	0	0	0	0	0	0	Sunk	8 June 1944	RAF Sunderland
U-971	1943	VIIC		0	0	0	0	0	0	0	0	0	0	Sunk	24 June 1944	HMS Eskimo, HMCS Haida & Czech Liberator
U-972	1943	VIIC		0	0	0	0	0	0	0	0	0	0	Missing	15 December 1943	
U-973	1943	VIIC		0	0	0	0	0	0	0	0	0	0	Sunk	6 March 1944	RN Swordfish
U-974	1943	VIIC		0	0	0	0	0	0	0	0	0	0	Sunk	19 April 1944	Norwegian sub HNoMS Ula
U-975	1943	VIIC		0	0	0	0	0	0	0	0	0	0	Surrendered	9 May 1945	Operation Deadlight
U-976	1943	VIIC		0	0	0	0	0	0	0	0	0	0	Sunk	25 March 1944	RAF Mosquito
U-977	1943	VIIC		0	0	0	0	0	0	0	0	0	0	Surrendered	17 August 1945	Mar del Plata, Argentina
U-978	1943	VIIC	Günther Pulst	0	0	0	0	0	0	0	0	1	7,176	Surrendered	9 May 1945	Operation Deadlight
U-979	1943	VIIC		1	348	1	5,969	0	0	1	6,386	0	0	Scuttled	24 May 1945	
U-980	1943	VIIC		0	0	0	0	0	0	0	0	0	0	Sunk	11 June 1944	RCAF Catalina
U-981	1943	VIIC		0	0	0	0	0	0	0	0	0	0	Sunk	12 August 1944	RAF Halifax
U-982	1943	VIIC		0	0	0	0	0	0	0	0	0	0	Sunk	9 April 1945	Air raid
U-983	1943	VIIC		0	0	0	0	0	0	0	0	0	0	Sunk	8 September 1943	Collision with U-988
U-984	1943	VIIC	Heinz Sieder	1	1,300	0	0	0	0	1	7,240	3	21,550	Sunk	On or about 2 August 1944	
U-985	1943	VIIC		0	0	0	0	1	1,735	0	0	0	0	Stricken	15 November 1944	Struck a mine
U-986	1943	VIIC		0	0	0	0	0	0	0	0	0	0	Missing	10 April 1944	
U-987	1943	VIIC		0	0	0	0	0	0	0	0	0	0	Sunk	15 June 1944	British sub HMS Satyr
U-988	1943	VIIC		0	0	0	0	0	0	0	0	0	0	Sunk	22 June 1944	US Liberator
U-989	1943	VIIC		0	0	0	0	1	1,791	1	7,176	0	0	Sunk	14 February 1945	HMS Bayntun, HMS Braithwaite, HMS Loch Eck and HMS Loch Dunvegan
U-990	1943	VIIC		1	1,920	0	0	0	0	0	0	0	0	Sunk	25 May 1944	RAF Liberator
U-991	1943	VIIC		0	0	0	0	0	0	0	0	0	0	Surrendered	9 May 1945	Operation Deadlight
U-992	1943	VIIC		1	1,060	0	0	0	0	0	0	0	0	Surrendered	9 May 1945	Operation Deadlight
U-993	1943	VIIC		0	0	0	0	0	0	0	0	0	0	Sunk	4 October 1944	Air raid
U-994	1943	VIIC		0	0	0	0	0	0	0	0	0	0	Surrendered	9 May 1945	Operation Deadlight
U-995	1943	VIIC/41	Hans-Georg Hess	2	738	0	0	3	1,560	0	0	1	7,176	Surrendered	9 May 1945	Renamed HNoMS Kaura (Royal Norwegian Navy), then museum ship
U-997	1943	VIIC/41	Hans Lehmann	1	105	0	0	1	1,603	1	4,287	0	0	Surrendered	9 May 1945	Operation Deadlight
U-998	1943	VIIC/41		0	0	0	0	0	0	0	0	0	0	Scrapped	1944	Depth charge damage
U-999	1943	VIIC/41		0	0	0	0	0	0	0	0	0	0	Scuttled	5 May 1945	
U-1000	1943	VIIC/41		0	0	0	0	0	0	0	0	0	0	Scrapped	1945	Mine damage
U-1001	1943	VIIC/41		0	0	0	0	0	0	0	0	0	0	Sunk	8 April 1945	HMS Fitzroy and HMS Byron
U-1002	1943	VIIC/41		0	0	0	0	0	0	0	0	0	0	Surrendered	9 May 1945	Operation Deadlight
U-1003	1943	VIIC/41		0	0	0	0	0	0	0	0	0	0	Scuttled	23 March 1945	HMCS New Glasgow
U-1004	1943	VIIC/41		1	980	0	0	1	1,313	0	0	0	0	Surrendered	9 May 1945	Operation Deadlight
U-1005	1943	VIIC/41		0	0	0	0	0	0	0	0	0	0	Surrendered	14 May 1945	Operation Deadlight
U-1006	1943	VIIC/41		0	0	0	0	0	0	0	0	0	0	Sunk	16 October 1944	HMCS Annan
U-1007	1943	VIIC/41		0	0	0	0	0	0	0	0	0	0	Scuttled	2 May 1945	RAF Typhoon
U-1008	1943	VIIC/41		0	0	0	0	0	0	0	0	0	0	Scuttled	6 May 1945	RAF Liberator
U-1009	1944	VIIC/41		0	0	0	0	0	0	0	0	0	0	Surrendered	10 May 1945	Operation Deadlight
U-1010	1944	VIIC/41		0	0	0	0	0	0	0	0	0	0	Surrendered	14 May 1945	Operation Deadlight
U-1013	1944	VIIC/41		0	0	0	0	0	0	0	0	0	0	Sunk	17 March 1944	Collision with U-286
U-1014	1944	VIIC/41		0	0	0	0	0	0	0	0	0	0	Sunk	4 February 1945	HMS Loch Scavaig, HMS Nyasaland, HMS Papua & HMS Loch Shin
U-1015	1944	VIIC/41		0	0	0	0	0	0	0	0	0	0	Sunk	19 May 1944	Collision with U-1014
U-1016	1944	VIIC/41		0	0	0	0	0	0	0	0	0	0	Scuttled	5 May 1945	
U-1017	1944	VIIC/41		0	0	0	0	2	10,604	0	0	0	0	Sunk	29 April 1945	RAF Liberator
U-1018	1944	VIIC/41		0	0	0	0	1	1,317	0	0	0	0	Sunk	27 February 1945	HMS Loch Fada
U-1019	1944	VIIC/41		0	0	0	0	0	0	0	0	0	0	Surrendered	9 May 1945	Operation Deadlight
U-1020	1944	VIIC/41		0	0	0	0	0	0	0	0	0	0	Sunk	9 January 1945	Struck a mine
U-1021	1944	VIIC/41		0	0	0	0	0	0	0	0	0	0	Sunk	14 March 1945	HMS Apollo minefield
U-1022	1944	VIIC/41		1	328	0	0	1	1,392	0	0	0	0	Surrendered	9 May 1945	Operation Deadlight
U-1023	1944	VIIC/41	Heinrich Schroeteler	1	335	0	0	0	0	1	7,345	0	0	Surrendered	10 May 1945	Operation Deadlight
U-1024	1944	VIIC/41		0	0	0	0	0	0	1	7,200	1	7,176	Captured	12 April 1945	HMS Loch Glendhu & HMS Loch More
U-1025	1944	VIIC/41		0	0	0	0	0	0	0	0	0	0	Scuttled	5 May 1945	
U-1051	1944	VIIC		1	1,300	0	0	1	1,152	0	0	0	0	Sunk	26 January 1945	HMS Aylmer, HMS Calder, HMS Bentinck, HMS Manners
U-1052	1944	VIIC		0	0	0	0	0	0	0	0	0	0	Surrendered	9 May 1945	Operation Deadlight
U-1053	1944	VIIC		0	0	0	0	0	0	0	0	0	0	Sunk	15 February 1945	Diving accident
U-1054	1944	VIIC		0	0	0	0	0	0	0	0	0	0	Stricken	16 September 1944	Collision with German ferry
U-1055	1944	VIIC		0	0	0	0	4	19,413	0	0	0	0	Missing	23 April 1945	
U-1056	1944	VIIC		0	0	0	0	0	0	0	0	0	0	Scuttled	5 May 1945	
U-1057	1944	VIIC		0	0	0	0	0	0	0	0	0	0	Surrendered	9 May 1945	Renamed S-81 Soviet Navy
U-1058	1944	VIIC		0	0	0	0	0	0	0	0	0	0	Surrendered	10 May 1945	Renamed S-82 Soviet Navy
U-1059	1943	VIIF		0	0	0	0	0	0	0	0	0	0	Sunk	19 March 1944	Supply boat. USN aircraft
U-1060	1943	VIIF		0	0	0	0	0	0	0	0	0	0	Grounded	27 October 1944	Supply boat. RAF & Czech aircraft
U-1061	1943	VIIF		0	0	0	0	0	0	0	0	0	0	Surrendered	9 May 1945	Supply boat. Operation Deadlight
U-1062	1943	VIIF		0	0	0	0	0	0	0	0	0	0	Sunk	30 September 1944	USS Fessenden
U-1063	1944	VIIC/41		0	0	0	0	0	0	0	0	0	0	Sunk	15 April 1945	HMS Loch Killin
U-1064	1944	VIIC/41		0	0	0	0	1	1,564	0	0	0	0	Surrendered	9 May 1945	Renamed S-83 Soviet Navy
U-1065	1944	VIIC/41		0	0	0	0	0	0	0	0	0	0	Sunk	9 April 1945	RAF Mosquito
U-1101	1943	VIIC		0	0	0	0	0	0	0	0	0	0	Scuttled	5 May 1945	
U-1102	1944	VIIC		0	0	0	0	0	0	0	0	0	0	Surrendered	13 May 1945	Operation Deadlight
U-1103	1943	VIIC/41		0	0	0	0	0	0	0	0	0	0	Surrendered	5 May 1945	Operation Deadlight
U-1104	1943	VIIC/41		0	0	0	0	0	0	0	0	0	0	Surrendered	9 May 1945	Operation Deadlight
U-1105	1944	VIIC/41		1	1,300	0	0	0	0	0	0	0	0	Surrendered	10 May 1945	Transferred to Royal Navy
U-1106	1944	VIIC/41		0	0	0	0	0	0	0	0	0	0	Sunk	29 March 1945	RAF Liberator
U-1107	1944	VIIC/41		0	0	0	0	2	15,209	0	0	0	0	Sunk	30 April 1945	US Liberator
U-1108	1944	VIIC/41		0	0	0	0	0	0	0	0	0	0	Surrendered	9 May 1945	Transferred to Royal Navy
U-1109	1944	VIIC/41		0	0	0	0	0	0	0	0	0	0	Surrendered	12 May 1945	Operation Deadlight
U-1110	1944	VIIC/41		0	0	0	0	0	0	0	0	0	0	Surrendered	14 May 1945	Operation Deadlight
U-1131	1944	VIIC		0	0	0	0	0	0	0	0	0	0	Sunk	30 March 1945	Air raid
U-1132	1944	VIIC		0	0	0	0	0	0	0	0	0	0	Scuttled	5 May 1945	
U-1161	1943	VIIC		0	0	0	0	0	0	0	0	0	0	Scuttled	5 May 1945	Served with Italian Navy
U-1162	1943	VIIC		0	0	0	0	0	0	0	0	0	0	Scuttled	5 May 1945	Served with Italian Navy
U-1163	1943	VIIC/41		0	0	0	0	1	433	0	0	0	0	Surrendered	9 May 1945	Operation Deadlight
U-1164	1943	VIIC/41		0	0	0	0	0	0	0	0	0	0	Stricken	24 July 1944	Air raid
U-1165	1943	VIIC/41		1	53	0	0	0	0	0	0	0	0	Surrendered	9 May 1945	Operation Deadlight
U-1166	1943	VIIC/41		0	0	0	0	0	0	0	0	0	0	Scuttled	3 May 1945	
U-1167	1943	VIIC/41		0	0	0	0	0	0	0	0	0	0	Sunk	30 March 1945	Air raid
U-1168	1943	VIIC/41		0	0	0	0	0	0	0	0	0	0	Scuttled	4 May 1945	
U-1169	1943	VIIC/41		0	0	0	0	0	0	0	0	0	0	Sunk	29 March 1945	HMS Duckworth
U-1170	1943	VIIC/41		0	0	0	0	0	0	0	0	0	0	Scuttled	2 May 1945	
U-1171	1943	VIIC/41		0	0	0	0	0	0	0	0	0	0	Surrendered	9 May 1945	Became British sub N19
U-1172	1943	VIIC/41		1	11,400	0	0	1	1,599	1	7,429	0	0	Sunk	27 January 1945	HMS Tyler, HMS Keats and HMS Bligh
U-1191	1943	VIIC		0	0	0	0	0	0	0	0	0	0	Sunk	3 July 1944	
U-1192	1943	VIIC		0	0	0	0	0	0	0	0	0	0	Scuttled	3 May 1945	
U-1193	1943	VIIC		0	0	0	0	0	0	0	0	0	0	Scuttled	5 May 1945	
U-1194	1943	VIIC		0	0	0	0	0	0	0	0	0	0	Surrendered	9 May 1945	Operation Deadlight
U-1195	1943	VIIC		0	0	0	0	2	18,614	0	0	0	0	Sunk	7 April 1945	HMS Watchman
U-1196	1943	VIIC		0	0	0	0	0	0	0	0	0	0	Scuttled	2 May 1945	
U-1197	1943	VIIC		0	0	0	0	0	0	0	0	0	0	Captured	May 1945	
U-1198	1943	VIIC		0	0	0	0	0	0	0	0	0	0	Surrendered	8 May 1945	Operation Deadlight
U-1199	1943	VIIC		0	0	0	0	0	0	0	0	1	7,176	Sunk	21 January 1945	HMS Icarus & HMS Mignonette
U-1200	1943	VIIC		0	0	0	0	0	0	0	0	0	0	Sunk	12 November 1944	
U-1201	1943	VIIC		0	0	0	0	0	0	0	0	0	0	Scuttled	3 May 1945	Air raid
U-1202	1943	VIIC	Rolf Thomsen	0	0	0	0	1	7,176	0	0	0	0	Surrendered	9 May 1945	Became Norwegian sub HNoMS Kinn
U-1203	1943	VIIC		1	580	0	0	0	0	0	0	0	0	Surrendered	9 May 1945	Operation Deadlight
U-1204	1943	VIIC		0	0	0	0	0	0	0	0	0	0	Scuttled	5 May 1945	
U-1205	1943	VIIC		0	0	0	0	0	0	0	0	0	0	Scuttled	3 May 1945	
U-1206	1943	VIIC		0	0	0	0	0	0	0	0	0	0	Scuttled	14 April 1945	Diving accident
U-1207	1944	VIIC		0	0	0	0	0	0	0	0	0	0	Scuttled	5 May 1945	
U-1208	1944	VIIC		0	0	0	0	1	1,644	0	0	0	0	Sunk	24 February 1945	HMS Duckworth and HMS Rowley
U-1209	1944	VIIC		0	0	0	0	0	0	0	0	0	0	Scuttled	18 December 1944	Ran aground
U-1210	1944	VIIC		0	0	0	0	0	0	0	0	0	0	Sunk	3 May 1945	Air raid
U-1221	1943	IXC/40		0	0	0	0	0	0	0	0	0	0	Sunk	3 April 1945	Air raid
U-1222	1943	IXC/40		0	0	0	0	0	0	0	0	0	0	Sunk	11 July 1944	RAF Sunderland
U-1223	1943	IXC/40		1	1,370	0	0	0	0	1	7,134	0	0	Scuttled	5 May 1945	
U-1224	1943	IXC/40		0	0	0	0	0	0	0	0	0	0	Sunk	13 May 1944	Served as Japanese sub RO 501
U-1225	1943	IXC/40		0	0	0	0	0	0	0	0	0	0	Sunk	24 June 1944	RCAF Catalina
U-1226	1943	IXC/40		0	0	0	0	0	0	0	0	0	0	Missing	23 October 1944	
U-1227	1943	IXC/40		1	1,370	0	0	0	0	0	0	0	0	Scuttled	3 May 1945	Air raid
U-1228	1943	IXC/40		1	900	0	0	0	0	0	0	0	0	Surrendered	17 May 1945	
U-1229	1943	IXC/40		0	0	0	0	0	0	0	0	0	0	Sunk	20 August 1944	USN Avenger and Wildcat aircraft
U-1230	1943	IXC/40		0	0	0	0	1	5,458	0	0	0	0	Surrendered	5 May 1945	Operation Deadlight
U-1231	1943	IXC/40		0	0	0	0	0	0	0	0	0	0	Surrendered	13 May 1945	Transferred to Soviet Navy
U-1232	1943	IXC/40	Kurt Dobratz	0	0	0	0	3	17,355	1	2,373	1	7,176	Stricken	April 1945	
U-1233	1943	IXC/40		0	0	0	0	0	0	0	0	0	0	Surrendered	5 May 1945	Operation Deadlight
U-1234	1944	IXC/40		0	0	0	0	0	0	0	0	0	0	Scuttled	5 May 1945	
U-1235	1944	IXC/40		0	0	0	0	0	0	0	0	0	0	Sunk	15 April 1945	USS Stanton and USS Frost
U-1271	1943	VIIC/41		0	0	0	0	0	0	0	0	0	0	Surrendered	9 May 1945	Operation Deadlight
U-1272	1943	VIIC/41		0	0	0	0	0	0	0	0	0	0	Surrendered	10 May 1945	Operation Deadlight
U-1273	1944	VIIC/41		0	0	0	0	0	0	0	0	0	0	Sunk	17 February 1945	Struck a mine
U-1274	1944	VIIC/41		0	0	0	0	1	8,966	0	0	0	0	Sunk	16 April 1945	HMS Viceroy
U-1275	1944	VIIC/41		0	0	0	0	0	0	0	0	0	0	Scuttled	3 May 1945	
U-1276	1944	VIIC/41		1	925	0	0	0	0	0	0	0	0	Sunk	20 February 1945	HMS Amethyst
U-1277	1944	VIIC/41		0	0	0	0	0	0	0	0	0	0	Scuttled	3 June 1945	Off coast of Portugal
U-1278	1944	VIIC/41		0	0	0	0	0	0	0	0	0	0	Sunk	17 February 1945	HMS Bayntun and HMS Loch Eck
U-1279	1944	VIIC/41		0	0	0	0	0	0	0	0	0	0	Sunk	27 February 1945	HMS Labuan, HMS Loch Fada and HMS Wild Goose
U-1301	1943	VIIC/41		0	0	0	0	0	0	0	0	0	0	Surrendered	9 May 1945	Operation Deadlight
U-1302	1944	VIIC/41		0	0	0	0	3	8,386	0	0	0	0	Sunk	7 March 1945	HMCS La Hulloise, HMCS Strathadam and HMCS Thetford Mines
U-1303	1944	VIIC/41		0	0	0	0	0	0	0	0	0	0	Scuttled	5 May 1945	
U-1304	1944	VIIC/41		0	0	0	0	0	0	0	0	0	0	Scuttled	5 May 1945	
U-1305	1944	VIIC/41		0	0	0	0	1	878	0	0	0	0	Surrendered	10 May 1945	Renamed S-84 Soviet Navy
U-1306	1944	VIIC/41		0	0	0	0	0	0	0	0	0	0	Scuttled	5 May 1945	
U-1307	1944	VIIC/41		0	0	0	0	0	0	0	0	0	0	Surrendered	9 May 1945	Operation Deadlight
U-1308	1944	VIIC/41		0	0	0	0	0	0	0	0	0	0	Scuttled	1 May 1945	
U-1405	1944	XVIIB		0	0	0	0	0	0	0	0	0	0	Scuttled	5 May 1945	
U-1406	1945	XVIIB		0	0	0	0	0	0	0	0	0	0	Surrendered	5 May 1945	Military Court
U-1407	1945	XVIIB		0	0	0	0	0	0	0	0	0	0	Surrendered	5 May 1945	HMS Meteorite
U-2321	1944	XXIII		0	0	0	0	1	1,406	0	0	0	0	Surrendered	9 May 1945	Operation Deadlight
U-2322	1944	XXIII		0	0	0	0	1	1,317	0	0	0	0	Surrendered	9 May 1945	Operation Deadlight
U-2323	1944	XXIII		0	0	0	0	0	0	0	0	0	0	Sunk	26 July 1944	Struck a mine
U-2324	1944	XXIII		0	0	0	0	0	0	0	0	0	0	Surrendered	9 May 1945	Operation Deadlight
U-2325	1944	XXIII		0	0	0	0	0	0	0	0	0	0	Surrendered	9 May 1945	Operation Deadlight
U-2326	1944	XXIII		0	0	0	0	0	0	0	0	0	0	Surrendered	14 May 1945	Became British sub N35
U-2327	1944	XXIII		0	0	0	0	0	0	0	0	0	0	Scuttled	2 May 1945	
U-2328	1944	XXIII		0	0	0	0	0	0	0	0	0	0	Surrendered	9 May 1945	Operation Deadlight
U-2329	1944	XXIII		0	0	0	0	0	0	0	0	0	0	Surrendered	9 May 1945	Operation Deadlight
U-2330	1944	XXIII		0	0	0	0	0	0	0	0	0	0	Scuttled	3 May 1945	
U-2331	1944	XXIII		0	0	0	0	0	0	0	0	0	0	Sunk	10 October 1944	Diving accident
U-2332	1944	XXIII		0	0	0	0	0	0	0	0	0	0	Scuttled	3 May 1945	
U-2333	1944	XXIII		0	0	0	0	0	0	0	0	0	0	Scuttled	5 May 1945	
U-2334	1944	XXIII		0	0	0	0	0	0	0	0	0	0	Surrendered	9 May 1945	Operation Deadlight
U-2335	1944	XXIII		0	0	0	0	0	0	0	0	0	0	Surrendered	9 May 1945	Operation Deadlight
U-2336	1944	XXIII		0	0	0	0	2	4,669	0	0	0	0	Surrendered	15 May 1945	Operation Deadlight
U-2337	1944	XXIII		0	0	0	0	0	0	0	0	0	0	Surrendered	9 May 1945	Operation Deadlight
U-2338	1944	XXIII		0	0	0	0	0	0	0	0	0	0	Sunk	4 May 1945	RAF Beaufighter
U-2339	1944	XXIII		0	0	0	0	0	0	0	0	0	0	Scuttled	5 May 1945	
U-2340	1944	XXIII		0	0	0	0	0	0	0	0	0	0	Sunk	30 March 1945	Air raid
U-2341	1944	XXIII		0	0	0	0	0	0	0	0	0	0	Surrendered	5 May 1945	Operation Deadlight
U-2342	1944	XXIII		0	0	0	0	0	0	0	0	0	0	Sunk	26 December 1944	Struck a mine
U-2343	1944	XXIII		0	0	0	0	0	0	0	0	0	0	Scuttled	5 May 1945	
U-2344	1944	XXIII		0	0	0	0	0	0	0	0	0	0	Sunk	18 February 1945	Collision with U-2336
U-2345	1944	XXIII		0	0	0	0	0	0	0	0	0	0	Surrendered	9 May 1945	Operation Deadlight
U-2346	1944	XXIII		0	0	0	0	0	0	0	0	0	0	Scuttled	5 May 1945	
U-2347	1944	XXIII		0	0	0	0	0	0	0	0	0	0	Scuttled	5 May 1945	
U-2348	1944	XXIII		0	0	0	0	0	0	0	0	0	0	Surrendered	9 May 1945	
U-2349	1944	XXIII		0	0	0	0	0	0	0	0	0	0	Scuttled	5 May 1945	
U-2350	1944	XXIII		0	0	0	0	0	0	0	0	0	0	Surrendered	9 May 1945	Operation Deadlight
U-2351	1944	XXIII		0	0	0	0	0	0	0	0	0	0	Surrendered	5 May 1945	Operation Deadlight
U-2352	1944	XXIII		0	0	0	0	0	0	0	0	0	0	Scuttled	5 May 1945	
U-2353	1944	XXIII		0	0	0	0	0	0	0	0	0	0	Surrendered	9 May 1945	Renamed M-51 Soviet Navy
U-2354	1944	XXIII		0	0	0	0	0	0	0	0	0	0	Surrendered	9 May 1945	Operation Deadlight
U-2355	1944	XXIII		0	0	0	0	0	0	0	0	0	0	Scuttled	3 May 1945	
U-2356	1944	XXIII		0	0	0	0	0	0	0	0	0	0	Surrendered	5 May 1945	Operation Deadlight
U-2357	1944	XXIII		0	0	0	0	0	0	0	0	0	0	Scuttled	5 May 1945	
U-2358	1944	XXIII		0	0	0	0	0	0	0	0	0	0	Scuttled	5 May 1945	
U-2359	1944	XXIII		0	0	0	0	0	0	0	0	0	0	Sunk	2 May 1945	RAF & RCAF Mosquito aircraft
U-2360	1944	XXIII		0	0	0	0	0	0	0	0	0	0	Scuttled	5 May 1945	
U-2361	1945	XXIII		0	0	0	0	0	0	0	0	0	0	Surrendered	9 May 1945	Operation Deadlight
U-2362	1945	XXIII		0	0	0	0	0	0	0	0	0	0	Scuttled	5 May 1945	
U-2363	1945	XXIII		0	0	0	0	0	0	0	0	0	0	Surrendered	9 May 1945	Operation Deadlight
U-2364	1945	XXIII		0	0	0	0	0	0	0	0	0	0	Scuttled	5 May 1945	
U-2365	1945	XXIII		0	0	0	0	0	0	0	0	0	0	Scuttled	8 May 1945	Raised & re-entered service in 1957
U-2366	1945	XXIII		0	0	0	0	0	0	0	0	0	0	Scuttled	5 May 1945	
U-2367	1945	XXIII		0	0	0	0	0	0	0	0	0	0	Sunk	5 May 1945	Collision with unidentified vessel
U-2368	1945	XXIII		0	0	0	0	0	0	0	0	0	0	Scuttled	5 May 1945	
U-2369	1945	XXIII		0	0	0	0	0	0	0	0	0	0	Scuttled	5 May 1945	
U-2371	1945	XXIII		0	0	0	0	0	0	0	0	0	0	Scuttled	3 May 1945	
U-2501	1944	XXI		0	0	0	0	0	0	0	0	0	0	Scuttled	3 May 1945	
U-2502	1944	XXI	Heinz Franke	0	0	0	0	0	0	0	0	0	0	Surrendered	9 May 1945	Operation Deadlight
U-2503	1944	XXI		0	0	0	0	0	0	0	0	0	0	Scuttled	4 May 1945	RAF Beaufighter
U-2504	1944	XXI		0	0	0	0	0	0	0	0	0	0	Scuttled	3 May 1945	
U-2505	1944	XXI		0	0	0	0	0	0	0	0	0	0	Buried		Elbe II bunker
U-2506	1944	XXI	Horst von Schroeter	0	0	0	0	0	0	0	0	0	0	Surrendered	9 May 1945	Operation Deadlight
U-2507	1944	XXI		0	0	0	0	0	0	0	0	0	0	Scuttled	5 May 1945	
U-2508	1944	XXI		0	0	0	0	0	0	0	0	0	0	Scuttled	3 May 1945	
U-2509	1944	XXI		0	0	0	0	0	0	0	0	0	0	Sunk	8 April 1945	Air raid
U-2510	1944	XXI		0	0	0	0	0	0	0	0	0	0	Scuttled	2 May 1945	
U-2511	1944	XXI	Adalbert Schnee	0	0	0	0	0	0	0	0	0	0	Surrendered	9 May 1945	Operation Deadlight
U-2512	1944	XXI		0	0	0	0	0	0	0	0	0	0	Scuttled	3 May 1945	
U-2513	1944	XXI	Erich Topp	0	0	0	0	0	0	0	0	0	0	Surrendered	9 May 1945	Transferred to US Navy
U-2514	1944	XXI		0	0	0	0	0	0	0	0	0	0	Sunk	8 April 1945	Air raid
U-2515	1944	XXI		0	0	0	0	0	0	0	0	0	0	Sunk	17 January 1945	Air raid
U-2516	1944	XXI		0	0	0	0	0	0	0	0	0	0	Sunk	9 April 1945	Air raid
U-2517	1944	XXI		0	0	0	0	0	0	0	0	0	0	Scuttled	5 May 1945	
U-2518	1944	XXI		0	0	0	0	0	0	0	0	0	0	Surrendered	9 May 1945	Became French sub Roland Morillot
U-2519	1944	XXI	Peter-Erich Cremer	0	0	0	0	0	0	0	0	0	0	Scuttled	3 May 1945	
U-2520	1944	XXI		0	0	0	0	0	0	0	0	0	0	Scuttled	3 May 1945	
U-2521	1944	XXI		0	0	0	0	0	0	0	0	0	0	Sunk	3 May 1945	RAF Typhoon
U-2522	1944	XXI		0	0	0	0	0	0	0	0	0	0	Scuttled	5 May 1945	
U-2523	1944	XXI		0	0	0	0	0	0	0	0	0	0	Sunk	17 January 1945	Air raid
U-2524	1944	XXI		0	0	0	0	0	0	0	0	0	0	Scuttled	3 May 1945	
U-2525	1944	XXI		0	0	0	0	0	0	0	0	0	0	Scuttled	5 May 1945	
U-2526	1944	XXI		0	0	0	0	0	0	0	0	0	0	Scuttled	2 May 1945	
U-2527	1944	XXI		0	0	0	0	0	0	0	0	0	0	Scuttled	2 May 1945	
U-2528	1944	XXI		0	0	0	0	0	0	0	0	0	0	Scuttled	2 May 1945	
U-2529	1944	XXI		0	0	0	0	0	0	0	0	0	0	Surrendered	9 May 1945	Transferred to Soviet Navy
U-2530	1944	XXI		0	0	0	0	0	0	0	0	0	0	Sunk	20 February 1945	Air raid
U-2531	1944	XXI		0	0	0	0	0	0	0	0	0	0	Scuttled	2 May 1945	
U-2533	1944	XXI		0	0	0	0	0	0	0	0	0	0	Scuttled	3 May 1945	
U-2534	1944	XXI		0	0	0	0	0	0	0	0	0	0	Scuttled	3 May 1945	
U-2535	1944	XXI		0	0	0	0	0	0	0	0	0	0	Scuttled	3 May 1945	
U-2536	1944	XXI		0	0	0	0	0	0	0	0	0	0	Scuttled	3 May 1945	
U-2538	1945	XXI		0	0	0	0	0	0	0	0	0	0	Scuttled	8 May 1945	
U-2539	1945	XXI		0	0	0	0	0	0	0	0	0	0	Scuttled	3 May 1945	
U-2540	1945	XXI		0	0	0	0	0	0	0	0	0	0	Scuttled	4 May 1945	Raised in 1957 & became research vessel Wilhelm Bauer
U-2541	1945	XXI		0	0	0	0	0	0	0	0	0	0	Scuttled	5 May 1945	
U-2542	1945	XXI		0	0	0	0	0	0	0	0	0	0	Sunk	3 April 1945	Air raid
U-2543	1945	XXI		0	0	0	0	0	0	0	0	0	0	Scuttled	3 May 1945	
U-2544	1945	XXI		0	0	0	0	0	0	0	0	0	0	Scuttled	5 May 1945	
U-2545	1945	XXI	Otto von Bülow	0	0	0	0	0	0	0	0	0	0	Scuttled	3 May 1945	
U-2546	1945	XXI		0	0	0	0	0	0	0	0	0	0	Scuttled	3 May 1945	
U-2548	1945	XXI		0	0	0	0	0	0	0	0	0	0	Scuttled	3 May 1945	
U-2551	1945	XXI	Gerhard Schaar	0	0	0	0	0	0	0	0	0	0	Aground	5 May 1945	Destroyed by Royal Navy post-war
U-2552	1945	XXI		0	0	0	0	0	0	0	0	0	0	Scuttled	3 May 1945	
U-3001	1944	XXI		0	0	0	0	0	0	0	0	0	0	Scuttled	3 May 1945	
U-3002	1944	XXI		0	0	0	0	0	0	0	0	0	0	Scuttled	2 May 1945	
U-3003	1944	XXI		0	0	0	0	0	0	0	0	0	0	Sunk	4 April 1945	Air raid
U-3004	1944	XXI		0	0	0	0	0	0	0	0	0	0	Buried		Elbe II bunker
U-3005	1944	XXI		0	0	0	0	0	0	0	0	0	0	Scuttled	3 May 1945	
U-3006	1944	XXI		0	0	0	0	0	0	0	0	0	0	Scuttled	1 May 1945	
U-3007	1944	XXI		0	0	0	0	0	0	0	0	0	0	Sunk	24 February 1945	Air raid
U-3008	1944	XXI		0	0	0	0	0	0	0	0	0	0	Surrendered	11 May 1945	Transferred to US Navy
U-3009	1944	XXI		0	0	0	0	0	0	0	0	0	0	Scuttled	1 May 1945	
U-3010	1944	XXI	Erich Topp	0	0	0	0	0	0	0	0	0	0	Scuttled	3 May 1945	
U-3011	1944	XXI		0	0	0	0	0	0	0	0	0	0	Scuttled	3 May 1945	
U-3012	1944	XXI		0	0	0	0	0	0	0	0	0	0	Scuttled	3 May 1945	
U-3013	1944	XXI		0	0	0	0	0	0	0	0	0	0	Scuttled	3 May 1945	
U-3014	1944	XXI	Karl-Heinz Marbach	0	0	0	0	0	0	0	0	0	0	Scuttled	3 May 1945	
U-3015	1944	XXI		0	0	0	0	0	0	0	0	0	0	Scuttled	5 May 1945	
U-3016	1944	XXI		0	0	0	0	0	0	0	0	0	0	Scuttled	2 May 1945	
U-3017	1944	XXI		0	0	0	0	0	0	0	0	0	0	Surrendered	9 May 1945	Became British sub N41
U-3018	1944	XXI		0	0	0	0	0	0	0	0	0	0	Scuttled	2 May 1945	
U-3019	1944	XXI		0	0	0	0	0	0	0	0	0	0	Scuttled	2 May 1945	
U-3020	1944	XXI		0	0	0	0	0	0	0	0	0	0	Scuttled	2 May 1945	
U-3021	1944	XXI		0	0	0	0	0	0	0	0	0	0	Scuttled	2 May 1945	
U-3022	1944	XXI		0	0	0	0	0	0	0	0	0	0	Scuttled	5 May 1945	
U-3023	1944	XXI		0	0	0	0	0	0	0	0	0	0	Scuttled	3 May 1945	
U-3024	1944	XXI		0	0	0	0	0	0	0	0	0	0	Scuttled	3 May 1945	
U-3025	1944	XXI		0	0	0	0	0	0	0	0	0	0	Scuttled	3 May 1945	
U-3026	1944	XXI		0	0	0	0	0	0	0	0	0	0	Scuttled	3 May 1945	
U-3027	1944	XXI		0	0	0	0	0	0	0	0	0	0	Scuttled	3 May 1945	
U-3028	1944	XXI		0	0	0	0	0	0	0	0	0	0	Scuttled	3 May 1945	
U-3029	1944	XXI		0	0	0	0	0	0	0	0	0	0	Scuttled	3 May 1945	
U-3030	1944	XXI		0	0	0	0	0	0	0	0	0	0	Scuttled	8 May 1945	
U-3031	1945	XXI		0	0	0	0	0	0	0	0	0	0	Scuttled	3 May 1945	
U-3032	1945	XXI		0	0	0	0	0	0	0	0	0	0	Sunk	3 May 1945	RAF Typhoon
U-3033	1945	XXI		0	0	0	0	0	0	0	0	0	0	Scuttled	4 May 1945	
U-3034	1945	XXI		0	0	0	0	0	0	0	0	0	0	Scuttled	4 May 1945	
U-3035	1945	XXI		0	0	0	0	0	0	0	0	0	0	Surrendered	9 May 1945	Transferred to Soviet Navy
U-3037	1945	XXI	Carl Emmermann	0	0	0	0	0	0	0	0	0	0	Scuttled	3 May 1945	
U-3038	1945	XXI		0	0	0	0	0	0	0	0	0	0	Scuttled	3 May 1945	
U-3039	1945	XXI		0	0	0	0	0	0	0	0	0	0	Scuttled	3 May 1945	
U-3040	1945	XXI		0	0	0	0	0	0	0	0	0	0	Scuttled	3 May 1945	
U-3041	1945	XXI		0	0	0	0	0	0	0	0	0	0	Surrendered	9 May 1945	Transferred to Soviet Navy
U-3044	1945	XXI		0	0	0	0	0	0	0	0	0	0	Scuttled	5 May 1945	
U-3501	1944	XXI		0	0	0	0	0	0	0	0	0	0	Scuttled	1 or 5 May 1945	
U-3502	1944	XXI		0	0	0	0	0	0	0	0	0	0	Stricken	3 May 1945	
U-3503	1944	XXI		0	0	0	0	0	0	0	0	0	0	Scuttled	8 May 1945	
U-3504	1944	XXI		0	0	0	0	0	0	0	0	0	0	Scuttled	2 May 1945	
U-3505	1944	XXI		0	0	0	0	0	0	0	0	0	0	Sunk	3 April 1945	Air raid
U-3506	1944	XXI	Gerhard Thäter	0	0	0	0	0	0	0	0	0	0	Buried		Elbe II bunker
U-3507	1944	XXI		0	0	0	0	0	0	0	0	0	0	Scuttled	3 May 1945	
U-3508	1944	XXI		0	0	0	0	0	0	0	0	0	0	Sunk	4 March 1945	Air raid
U-3509	1944	XXI	Heinz Franke	0	0	0	0	0	0	0	0	0	0	Scuttled	3 May 1945	
U-3510	1944	XXI		0	0	0	0	0	0	0	0	0	0	Scuttled	5 May 1945	
U-3511	1944	XXI		0	0	0	0	0	0	0	0	0	0	Scuttled	3 May 1945	
U-3512	1944	XXI		0	0	0	0	0	0	0	0	0	0	Sunk	8 April 1945	Air raid
U-3513	1944	XXI		0	0	0	0	0	0	0	0	0	0	Scuttled	3 May 1945	
U-3514	1944	XXI		0	0	0	0	0	0	0	0	0	0	Surrendered	9 May 1945	Operation Deadlight
U-3515	1944	XXI		0	0	0	0	0	0	0	0	0	0	Surrendered	9 May 1945	Transferred to Soviet Navy
U-3516	1944	XXI		0	0	0	0	0	0	0	0	0	0	Scuttled	2 May 1945	
U-3517	1944	XXI		0	0	0	0	0	0	0	0	0	0	Scuttled	2 May 1945	
U-3518	1944	XXI		0	0	0	0	0	0	0	0	0	0	Scuttled	3 May 1945	
U-3519	1944	XXI		0	0	0	0	0	0	0	0	0	0	Sunk	2 March 1945	Struck a mine
U-3520	1944	XXI		0	0	0	0	0	0	0	0	0	0	Sunk	31 January 1945	Struck a mine
U-3521	1944	XXI		0	0	0	0	0	0	0	0	0	0	Scuttled	2 May 1945	
U-3522	1944	XXI		0	0	0	0	0	0	0	0	0	0	Scuttled	2 May 1945	
U-3523	1944	XXI		0	0	0	0	0	0	0	0	0	0	Sunk	6 May 1945	RAF Liberator
U-3524	1944	XXI	Hans Witt	0	0	0	0	0	0	0	0	0	0	Scuttled	5 May 1945	
U-3525	1944	XXI		0	0	0	0	0	0	0	0	0	0	Scuttled	3 May 1945	
U-3526	1944	XXI		0	0	0	0	0	0	0	0	0	0	Scuttled	5 May 1945	
U-3527	1945	XXI		0	0	0	0	0	0	0	0	0	0	Scuttled	5 May 1945	
U-3528	1945	XXI		0	0	0	0	0	0	0	0	0	0	Scuttled	5 May 1945	
U-3529	1945	XXI		0	0	0	0	0	0	0	0	0	0	Scuttled	5 May 1945	
U-3530	1945	XXI		0	0	0	0	0	0	0	0	0	0	Scuttled	3 May 1945	
U-4701	1944	XXIII		0	0	0	0	0	0	0	0	0	0	Scuttled	5 May 1945	
U-4702	1944	XXIII		0	0	0	0	0	0	0	0	0	0	Scuttled	5 May 1945	
U-4703	1945	XXIII		0	0	0	0	0	0	0	0	0	0	Scuttled	5 May 1945	
U-4704	1945	XXIII		0	0	0	0	0	0	0	0	0	0	Scuttled	5 May 1945	
U-4705	1945	XXIII		0	0	0	0	0	0	0	0	0	0	Scuttled	3 May 1945	
U-4706	1945	XXIII		0	0	0	0	0	0	0	0	0	0	Surrendered	9 May 1945	Became Norwegian sub HNoMS Knerter
U-4707	1945	XXIII		0	0	0	0	0	0	0	0	0	0	Scuttled	5 May 1945	
U-4709	1945	XXIII		0	0	0	0	0	0	0	0	0	0	Scuttled	4 May 1945	
U-4710	1945	XXIII	Ludwig von Friedeburg	0	0	0	0	0	0	0	0	0	0	Scuttled	5 May 1945	
U-4711	1945	XXIII		0	0	0	0	0	0	0	0	0	0	Scuttled	4 May 1945	
U-4712	1945	XXIII		0	0	0	0	0	0	0	0	0	0	Scuttled	3 May 1945	
