= Troodos =

Troodos may refer to

- Troodos Mountains, Cyprus
- Troodos Station, Ministry of Defence (UK) signals station in the Troodos Mountains
- SS Troödos, a Cypriot coaster in service 1947–52
