= SS Erna =

German 865 GRT coaster

History
- Name: Erna (1922-46); Empire Conforth (1946-47); Troödos (1947-52); Burica (1952-52); Dmitris (1953-55); Cedar (1955-58)
- Owner: H A Petersen (1922-30); Ernst Russ (1930-46); Ministry of Transport (1946-47); Cyprus Ship Management Co (1947-52); Compagnia Maritima Punta Burica SA (1952-53); Compagnia Santa Angelica (1953-55); Metropolitan Agencies Ltd (1955-58)
- Operator: H A Petersen (1922-30); Ernst Russ (1930-46); Ministry of Transport (1946-47); Cyprus Ship Management Co (1947-52); Compagnia Maritima Punta Burica SA (1952-53); Compagnia Santa Angelica (1953-55); Metropolitan Agencies Ltd (1955-58)
- Port of registry: (Weimar Republic) Flensburg (1922-30); (Weimar Republic) Hamburg (1930-33); (Nazi Germany) Hamburg (1943-45); (Allied-occupied Germany) Hamburg (1945-46); (United Kingdom) London (1945-47); Cyprus (1947-52); Costa Rica (1952-55); Panama City (1955-58)
- Builder: Howaldtswerke
- Yard number: 660
- Launched: 1922
- Identification: Code Letters LNRK (1922-34); Code Letter DHGP (1934-46)
- Fate: Scrapped 1958

General characteristics
- Type: Coaster
- Tonnage: 865 GRT; 491 NRT
- Length: 194 ft 6 in (59.28 m)
- Beam: 32 ft 9 in (9.98 m)
- Depth: 13 ft 9 in (4.19 m)
- Installed power: Triple expansion steam engine
- Propulsion: Screw propeller

Erna was an 865 GRT coaster that was built in 1922 by Howaldtswerke, Kiel, Germany for German owners. She was seized by the Allies at Kristiansand, Norway in July 1946, passed to the Ministry of Transport (MoT) and renamed Empire Confederation. In 1947, she was sold to Cyprus and renamed Troödos. In 1952, she was sold to Costa Rica and renamed Burica, then another sale in 1953 saw her renamed Dmitris. In 1955, she was sold to Panama and renamed Cedar. She served until 1958 when she was scrapped in Hong Kong.

== Description ==
The ship was built in 1922 as yard number 660 by Howaldtswerke, Kiel.

The ship was 194 feet 6 inches (59.28 m) long, with a beam of 32 feet 9 inches (9.98 m) a depth of 13 feet 9 inches (4.19 m). She had a GRT of 865 and a NRT of 491.

The ship was propelled by a triple expansion steam engine, which had cylinders of 13 3/8 inches (34 cm), 23 1/4 inches (59 cm) and 38 3/16 inches (97.0 cm) diameter by 25 3/5 inches (65 cm) stroke. The engine was built by Howaldtswerke.

== History ==
Erna was built for H A Petersen, Flensburg. She was the last ship operated by that company. On 11 April 1930, Erna was sold to Ernst Russ, Hamburg. Her port of registry was Hamburg and she used the Code Letters LNRK. On 14 February 1944, Erna was involved in a collision with U-738 off Gotenhafen, German-occupied Poland (43°31′N 18°33′E). U-738 sank with the loss of 22 of her 46 crew. On 17 March 1945, Erna was damaged by fire in an air raid. In July 1946, she was seized by the Allies at Kristiansand, Norway. She was passed to the MoT and renamed Empire Conforth.

In 1947, Empire Conforth was sold to Cyprus Ship Management Co, Cyprus and was renamed Troödos. In 1952, she was sold to Compagnia Maritima Punta Burica SA, Costa Rica and renamed Burica. In 1953, she was sold to Compagnia Santa Angelica, Costa Rica and renamed Dmitris. In 1955, she was sold to Metropolitan Agencies Ltd, Panama and renamed Cedar. She served until 1958 when she was scrapped in Hong Kong.
