= German submarine U-1053 =

German World War II submarine

- Type VIIC submarine U-570 which looked almost identical to U-1053.

History

Nazi Germany
- Name: U-1053
- Ordered: 5 June 1941
- Builder: F. Krupp Germaniawerft AG, Kiel
- Yard number: 687
- Laid down: 8 February 1943
- Launched: 13 January 1944
- Commissioned: 12 February 1944
- Fate: Sunk on 15 February 1945

General characteristics
- Class & type: Type VIIC submarine
- Displacement: 864.7 t (851 long tons) submerged
- Length: 67.10 m (220 ft 2 in) o/a; 50.50 m (165 ft 8 in) pressure hull
- Beam: 6.18 m (20 ft 3 in) o/a; 4.68 m (15 ft 4 in) pressure hull
- Height: 9.60 m (31 ft 6 in)
- Draught: 4.74 m (15 ft 7 in)
- Installed power: 2,800–3,200 PS (2,100–2,400 kW; 2,800–3,200 bhp) (diesels); 750 PS (550 kW; 740 shp) (electric)
- Propulsion: 2 shafts; 2 × 4-stroke M6V 40/46 Germaniawerft; 2 x 62 batteries; 2 x six-cylinder supercharged diesel engines; 2 × electric motors
- Speed: 17.6 knots (32.6 km/h; 20.3 mph) surfaced; 7.5 knots (13.9 km/h; 8.6 mph) submerged
- Range: 8,500 nmi (15,700 km; 9,800 mi) at 10 knots (19 km/h; 12 mph) surfaced; 80 nmi (150 km; 92 mi) at 4 knots (7.4 km/h; 4.6 mph) submerged
- Test depth: 220 m (720 ft); Crush depth: 250–295 m (820–968 ft)
- Complement: 44–45 crew
- Armament: 5 × 53.3 cm (21 in) torpedo tubes (four bow, one stern); 14 × torpedoes; 1 × 8.8 cm (3.46 in) deck gun (220 rounds); 1 × 3.7 cm (1.5 in) Flak M42 AA gun; 2 × twin 2 cm (0.79 in) C/30 anti-aircraft guns

Service record
- Part of: 5th U-boat Flotilla; 12 February – 31 October 1944; 11th U-boat Flotilla; 1 November 1944 – 15 February 1945
- Identification codes: M 49 600
- Commanders: Oblt.z.S. Helmut Lange; 12 February 1944 – 15 February 1945
- Operations: 1 patrol: a. 7 November 1944 – 21 January 1945; b. 15 February 1945
- Victories: None

German submarine U-1053 was a Type VIIC U-boat of Nazi Germany's Kriegsmarine during World War II.

== Construction ==
The U-1053 was laid down on 8 February 1943 at the Germaniawerft yard in Kiel, Germany. She was launched on 13 January 1944 and commissioned on 12 February 1944 under the command of Oberleutnant zur See Helmut Lange. Her U-boat emblem was Crossed Swords.

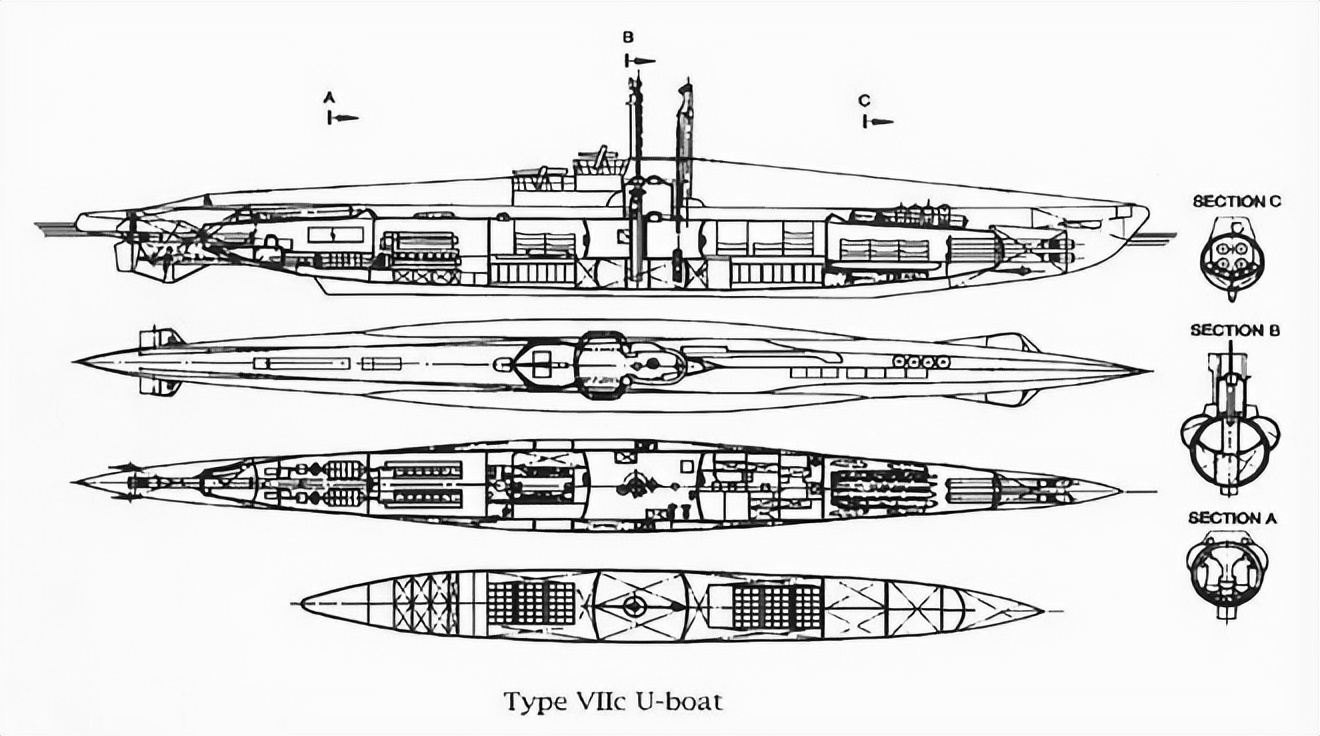
A cross-section of a Type VIIC U-boat.

When she was completed, the submarine was 67.10 metres (220 ft 2 in) long, with a beam of 6.18 metres (20 ft 3 in), a height of 9.60 metres (31 ft 6 in) and a draft of 4.74 metres (15 ft 7 in). She was assessed at 864.7 t (851 long tons) submerged. The submarine was powered by two Germaniawerft F46 four-stroke, six-cylinder supercharged diesel engines producing a total of 2,800 to 3,200 metric horsepower (2,060 to 2,350 kW; 2,760 to 3,160 shp) for use while surfaced and two AEG GU 460/8-276 double-acting electric motors producing a total of 750 metric horsepower (550 kW; 740 shp) for use while submerged. She had two shafts and two 1.23 m (4 ft) propellers. The submarine was capable of operating at depths of up to 230 metres (750 ft), had a maximum surface speed of 17.6 knots (32.6 km/h; 20.3 mph) and a maximum submerged speed of 7.5 knots (13.9 km/h; 8.6 mph).When submerged, the U-boat could operate for 80 nautical miles (150 km; 92 mi) at 4 knots (7.4 km/h; 4.6 mph) and when surfaced, she could travel 8,500 nautical miles (15,700 km; 9,800 mi) at 10 knots (19 km/h; 12 mph).

The submarine was fitted with five 53.3 cm (21 in) torpedo tubes (four fitted at the bow and one at the stern), fourteen torpedoes, one 8.8 cm (3.46 in) deck gun (220 rounds), one 3.7 cm (1.5 in) Flak M42 and two twin 2 cm (0.79 in) C/30 anti-aircraft guns. The boat had a complement of 44 to 57 men.

== Service history ==
U-1053 was used as a Training ship in the 5th U-boat Flotilla from 12 February 1944 until 31 October 1944 before serving in the 11th U-boat Flotilla for active service on 1 November 1944. The submarine was fitted with a Schnorchel underwater-breathing apparatus in March 1944.

During her active service, U-1053 made one patrol. She left Horten on 7 November 1944 and patrolled a large part of the Atlantic Ocean before arriving at Stavanger on 21 January 1945 after a patrol of 76 days. In total U-1053 spend 81 days at sea.

== Sinking ==
The U-1053 left Bergen, Norway on 15 February 1945 and arrived the same day in the North Sea in the Byfjord, northwest of Bergen. She was there on a diving trial, after an overhaul in the naval yard at Bergen, the submarine was forced to carry out her diving trials in the Byfjord. There were 38 crew members on board including the commander and seven Norwegian engineers and foremen from the naval yard.

The U-1053 dived normally, but after this first dive there must have been an accident aboard. When the submarine surfaced, her bow suddenly stuck up into the air at a steep angle and the submarine sank quickly in the sea stern first. Other boats came to the scene and even heard knocking from the inside of the submarine from the trapped crew. The submarine sank to a depth of 340 metres (1,120 ft) taking all 45 crew, engineers and foremen with her. The accident was probably a result of an operational error at the Snorkel facility, but sabotage couldn't be ruled out.

== Wreck ==
The wreck of U-1053 was located at 60°26′N 05°16′E on 18 March 2010 and her discovery was announced by the Norwegian Navy. The wreck is broken up into several pieces which indicates that the submarine hit the sea floor at a high speed.

== Bibliography ==
- Busch, Rainer; Röll, Hans-Joachim (1999). German U-boat commanders of World War II : a biographical dictionary. Translated by Brooks, Geoffrey. London, Annapolis, Md: Greenhill Books, Naval Institute Press. ISBN 1-55750-186-6.
- Gröner, Erich; Jung, Dieter; Maass, Martin (1991). German Warships 1815–1945, U-boats and Mine Warfare Vessels. Vol. 2. Translated by Thomas, Keith; Magowan, Rachel. London: Conway Maritime Press. ISBN 0-85177-593-4.
