= German submarine U-1168 =

German World War II submarine

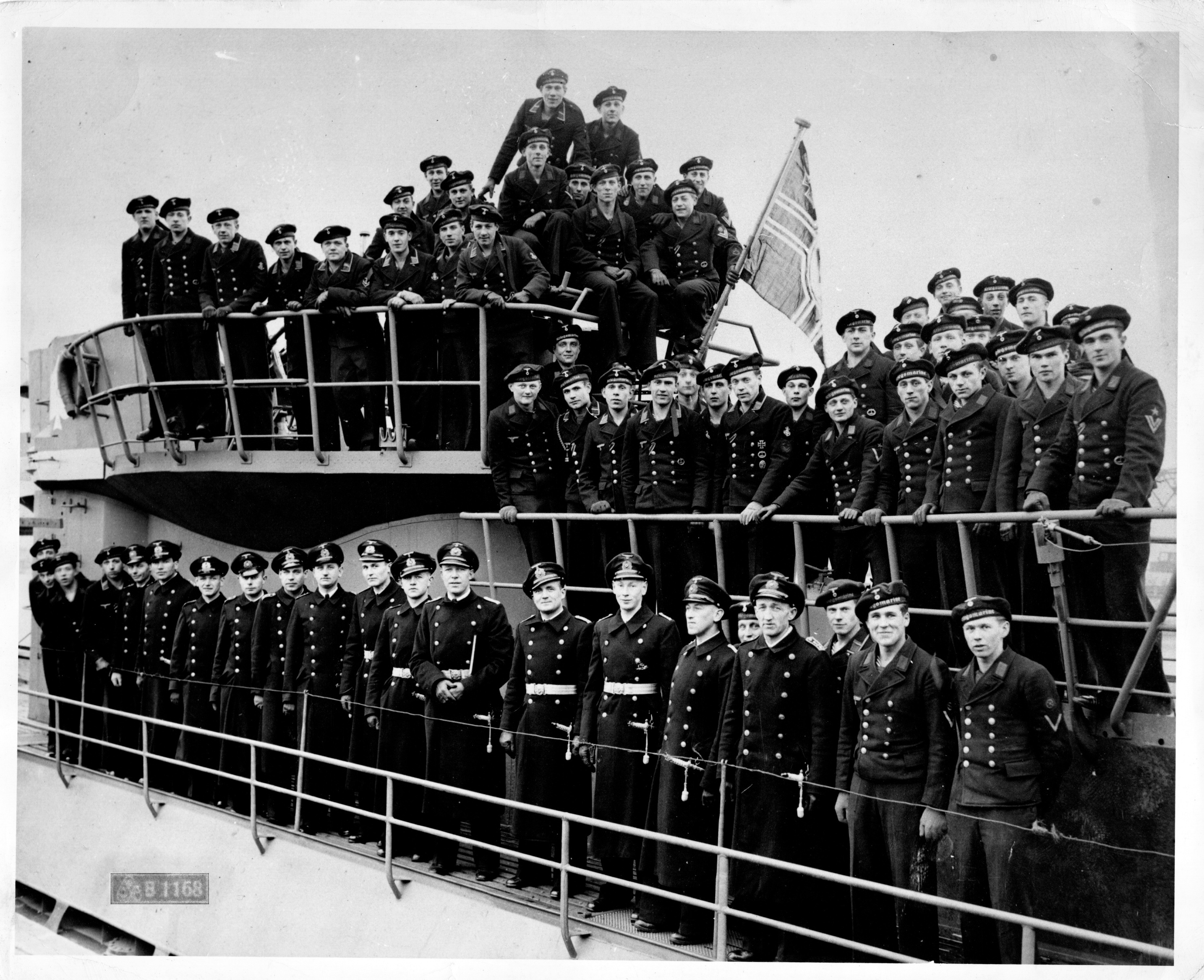
- U-1168 Complement - Officers and Enlisted Men.

History

Nazi Germany
- Name: U-1168
- Ordered: 2 April 1942
- Builder: Danziger Werft AG, Danzig
- Yard number: 140
- Laid down: 16 March 1943
- Launched: 2 October 1943
- Commissioned: 19 January 1944
- Fate: Scuttled on 4 May 1945

General characteristics
- Type: Type VIIC/41 submarine
- Displacement: 757 long tons (769 t) surfaced; 857 long tons (871 t) submerged
- Length: 67.10 m (220 ft 2 in) o/a; 50.50 m (165 ft 8 in) pressure hull
- Beam: 6.20 m (20 ft 4 in) o/a; 4.70 m (15 ft 5 in) pressure hull
- Height: 9.60 m (31 ft 6 in)
- Draught: 4.74 m (15 ft 7 in)
- Installed power: 2 × diesel engines; 2,800–3,200 PS (2,100–2,400 kW; 2,800–3,200 bhp) (diesels); 750 PS (550 kW; 740 shp) (electric)
- Propulsion: 2 × electric motors; 2 × screws
- Speed: 17.7 knots (32.8 km/h; 20.4 mph) surfaced; 7.6 knots (14.1 km/h; 8.7 mph) submerged
- Range: 8,500 nmi (15,700 km; 9,800 mi) at 10 knots (19 km/h; 12 mph) surfaced; 80 nmi (150 km; 92 mi) at 4 knots (7.4 km/h; 4.6 mph) submerged
- Test depth: 250 m (820 ft); Calculated crush depth: 250–295 m (820–968 ft)
- Complement: 44-52 officers & ratings
- Armament: 5 × 53.3 cm (21 in) torpedo tubes (4 bow, 1 stern); 14 × torpedoes or; 26 × TMA or TMB Naval mines; 1 × 8.8 cm (3.46 in) deck gun (220 rounds); 1 × 3.7 cm (1.5 in) Flak M42 AA gun; 2 × 2 cm (0.79 in) C/30 AA guns

Service record
- Part of: 8th U-boat Flotilla; 19 January 1944 – 7 February 1945; 5th U-boat Flotilla; 8 February – 4 May 1945
- Identification codes: M 49 689
- Commanders: Oblt.z.S. Martin Grasse; 19 January – July 1944; Kptlt. Hans Umlauf; July 1944 – 4 May 1945
- Operations: None
- Victories: None

German submarine U-1168 was a Type VIIC/41 U-boat of Nazi Germany's Kriegsmarine during World War II.

She was ordered on 2 April 1942, and was laid down on 16 March 1943, at Danziger Werft AG, Danzig, as yard number 140. She was launched on 2 October 1943, and commissioned under the command of Oberleutnant zur See Martin Grasse on 19 January 1944.

== Design ==
German Type VIIC/41 submarines were preceded by the heavier Type VIIC submarines. U-1168 had a displacement of 769 tonnes (757 long tons) when at the surface and 871 tonnes (857 long tons) while submerged. She had a total length of 67.10 m (220 ft 2 in), a pressure hull length of 50.50 m (165 ft 8 in), an overall beam of 6.20 m (20 ft 4 in), a height of 9.60 m (31 ft 6 in), and a draught of 4.74 m (15 ft 7 in). The submarine was powered by two Germaniawerft F46 four-stroke, six-cylinder supercharged diesel engines producing a total of 2,800 to 3,200 metric horsepower (2,060 to 2,350 kW; 2,760 to 3,160 shp) for use while surfaced, two SSW GU 343/38-8 double-acting electric motors producing a total of 750 metric horsepower (550 kW; 740 shp) for use while submerged. She had two shafts and two 1.23 m (4 ft) propellers. The boat was capable of operating at depths of up to 230 metres (750 ft).

The submarine had a maximum surface speed of 17.7 knots (32.8 km/h; 20.4 mph) and a maximum submerged speed of 7.6 knots (14.1 km/h; 8.7 mph). When submerged, the boat could operate for 80 nautical miles (150 km; 92 mi) at 4 knots (7.4 km/h; 4.6 mph); when surfaced, she could travel 8,500 nautical miles (15,700 km; 9,800 mi) at 10 knots (19 km/h; 12 mph). U-1168 was fitted with five 53.3 cm (21 in) torpedo tubes (four fitted at the bow and one at the stern), fourteen torpedoes or 26 TMA or TMB Naval mines, one 8.8 cm (3.46 in) SK C/35 naval gun, (220 rounds), one 3.7 cm (1.5 in) Flak M42 and two 2 cm (0.79 in) C/30 anti-aircraft guns. The boat had a complement of between forty-four and fifty-two.

== Service history ==
On 4 May 1945, U-1168 was scuttled after running aground off Holnis in the Flensburg Fjord, at 54°53′N 09°37′E. The wreck was later broken up.

== See also ==
- Battle of the Atlantic

== Bibliography ==
- Busch, Rainer; Röll, Hans-Joachim (1999). German U-boat commanders of World War II : a biographical dictionary. Translated by Brooks, Geoffrey. London, Annapolis, Md: Greenhill Books, Naval Institute Press. ISBN 1-55750-186-6.
- Busch, Rainer; Röll, Hans-Joachim (1999). Deutsche U-Boot-Verluste von September 1939 bis Mai 1945 [German U-boat losses from September 1939 to May 1945]. Der U-Boot-Krieg (in German). Vol. IV. Hamburg, Berlin, Bonn: Mittler. ISBN 3-8132-0514-2.
- Gröner, Erich; Jung, Dieter; Maass, Martin (1991). German Warships 1815–1945, U-boats and Mine Warfare Vessels. Vol. 2. Translated by Thomas, Keith; Magowan, Rachel. London: Conway Maritime Press. ISBN 0-85177-593-4.
