= German submarine U-647 =

German World War II submarine

Coordinates: 59°53′30″N 2°23′02″W

History

Nazi Germany
- Name: U-647
- Ordered: 10 April 1941
- Builder: Blohm & Voss, Hamburg
- Yard number: 623
- Laid down: 29 December 1941
- Launched: 16 September 1942
- Commissioned: 5 November 1942
- Fate: Missing since 28 July 1943 east of Shetland

General characteristics
- Class & type: Type VIIC submarine
- Displacement: 769 t (757 long tons) surfaced; 871 t (857 long tons) submerged
- Length: 67.10 m (220 ft 2 in) (o/a); 50.50 m (165 ft 8 in) (pressure hull)
- Beam: 6.20 m (20 ft 4 in) (o/a); 4.70 m (15 ft 5 in) (pressure hull)
- Height: 9.60 m (31 ft 6 in)
- Draught: 4.74 m (15 ft 7 in)
- Installed power: 2,800–3,200 PS (2,100–2,400 kW; 2,800–3,200 bhp) (diesels); 750 PS (550 kW; 740 shp) (electric)
- Propulsion: 2 shafts; 2 × diesel engines; 2 × electric motors
- Speed: 17.7 knots (32.8 km/h; 20.4 mph) surfaced; 7.6 knots (14.1 km/h; 8.7 mph) submerged
- Range: 8,500 nmi (15,700 km; 9,800 mi) at 10 knots (19 km/h; 12 mph) surfaced; 80 nmi (150 km; 92 mi) at 4 knots (7.4 km/h; 4.6 mph) submerged
- Test depth: 230 m (750 ft); Crush depth: 250–295 m (820–968 ft)
- Complement: 4 officers, 40–56 enlisted
- Armament: 5 × torpedo tubes (four bow, one stern); 14 × 53.3 cm (21 in) torpedoes or 26 TMA mines; 1 × 8.8 cm (3.46 in) deck gun (220 rounds); 1 × twin 2 cm (0.79 in) C/30 anti-aircraft gun

Service record
- Part of: 5th U-boat Flotilla; 5 November 1942 – 31 May 1943; 7th U-boat Flotilla; 1 June – 28 July 1943
- Identification codes: M 49 799
- Commanders: Kptlt. Willi Hertin; 5 November 1942 – 28 July 1943
- Operations: 1 patrol: 22 – 28 July 1943
- Victories: None

German submarine U-647 was a Type VIIC U-boat of Nazi Germany's Kriegsmarine during World War II. The submarine was laid down on 29 December 1941 at the Blohm & Voss yard at Hamburg, launched on 16 September 1942, and commissioned on 5 November 1942 under the command of Kapitänleutnant Willi Hertin.

Attached to 5th U-boat Flotilla based at Kiel, U-647 completed her training period on 31 May 1943 and was assigned to front-line service.

== Design ==
German Type VIIC submarines were preceded by the shorter Type VIIB submarines. U-647 had a displacement of 769 tonnes (757 long tons) when at the surface and 871 tonnes (857 long tons) while submerged. She had a total length of 67.10 m (220 ft 2 in), a pressure hull length of 50.50 m (165 ft 8 in), a beam of 6.20 m (20 ft 4 in), a height of 9.60 m (31 ft 6 in), and a draught of 4.74 m (15 ft 7 in). The submarine was powered by two Germaniawerft F46 four-stroke, six-cylinder supercharged diesel engines producing a total of 2,800 to 3,200 metric horsepower (2,060 to 2,350 kW; 2,760 to 3,160 shp) for use while surfaced, two Brown, Boveri & Cie GG UB 720/8 double-acting electric motors producing a total of 750 metric horsepower (550 kW; 740 shp) for use while submerged. She had two shafts and two 1.23 m (4 ft) propellers. The boat was capable of operating at depths of up to 230 metres (750 ft).

The submarine had a maximum surface speed of 17.7 knots (32.8 km/h; 20.4 mph) and a maximum submerged speed of 7.6 knots (14.1 km/h; 8.7 mph). When submerged, the boat could operate for 80 nautical miles (150 km; 92 mi) at 4 knots (7.4 km/h; 4.6 mph); when surfaced, she could travel 8,500 nautical miles (15,700 km; 9,800 mi) at 10 knots (19 km/h; 12 mph). U-647 was fitted with five 53.3 cm (21 in) torpedo tubes (four fitted at the bow and one at the stern), fourteen torpedoes, one 8.8 cm (3.46 in) SK C/35 naval gun, 220 rounds, and one twin 2 cm (0.79 in) C/30 anti-aircraft gun. The boat had a complement of between forty-four and sixty.

== Service history ==
On the first and only war patrol U-647 was last heard of on 28 July 1943 and declared missing on 3 August 1943.

She was identified in 1977 on the seabed in the vicinity of the Frigg gas field. It likely struck a mine and sunk. No torpedoes were on board, and it was decided to take no action.

== Bibliography ==
- Busch, Rainer; Röll, Hans-Joachim (1999a). German U-boat commanders of World War II : a biographical dictionary. Translated by Brooks, Geoffrey. London, Annapolis, Md: Greenhill Books, Naval Institute Press. ISBN 1-55750-186-6.
- Busch, Rainer; Röll, Hans-Joachim (1999b). Der U-Boot-Krieg, 1939-1945: Deutsche U-Boot-Verluste von September 1939 bis Mai 1945 [German U-boat losses from September 1939 to May 1945] (in German). Vol. IV. Hamburg, Berlin, Bonn: Mittler. ISBN 3-8132-0514-2.
- Gröner, Eric; Jung, Dieter; Maass, Martin (1991). German Warships 1815-1945: U-boats and Mine Warfare Vessels. Vol. 2. Translated by Thomas, Keith; Magowan, Rachel. London: Conway Maritime Press. ISBN 0-85177-593-4.
