= German submarine U-1054 =

German World War II submarine

- Type VIIC submarine U-570 which looked almost identical to U-1054.

History

Nazi Germany
- Name: U-1054
- Ordered: 5 June 1941
- Builder: F. Krupp Germaniawerft AG, Kiel
- Yard number: 688
- Laid down: 30 March 1943
- Launched: 24 February 1944
- Commissioned: 25 March 1944
- Decommissioned: 16 September 1944
- Fate: Scrapped in May 1945

General characteristics
- Class & type: Type VIIC submarine
- Displacement: 864.7 t (851 long tons) submerged
- Length: 67.10 m (220 ft 2 in) o/a; 50.50 m (165 ft 8 in) pressure hull
- Beam: 6.18 m (20 ft 3 in) o/a; 4.68 m (15 ft 4 in) pressure hull
- Height: 9.60 m (31 ft 6 in)
- Draught: 4.74 m (15 ft 7 in)
- Installed power: 2,800–3,200 PS (2,100–2,400 kW; 2,800–3,200 bhp) (diesels); 750 PS (550 kW; 740 shp) (electric)
- Propulsion: 2 shafts; 2 × 4-stroke M6V 40/46 Germaniawerft; 2 x 62 batteries; 2 x six-cylinder supercharged diesel engines; 2 × electric motors
- Speed: 17.6 knots (32.6 km/h; 20.3 mph) surfaced; 7.5 knots (13.9 km/h; 8.6 mph) submerged
- Range: 8,500 nmi (15,700 km; 9,800 mi) at 10 knots (19 km/h; 12 mph) surfaced; 80 nmi (150 km; 92 mi) at 4 knots (7.4 km/h; 4.6 mph) submerged
- Test depth: 220 m (720 ft); Crush depth: 250–295 m (820–968 ft)
- Complement: 44–57 crew
- Armament: 5 × 53.3 cm (21 in) torpedo tubes (four bow, one stern); 14 × torpedoes; 1 × 8.8 cm (3.46 in) deck gun (220 rounds); 1 × 3.7 cm (1.5 in) Flak M42 AA gun; 2 × twin 2 cm (0.79 in) C/30 anti-aircraft guns

Service record
- Part of: 5th U-boat Flotilla; 25 March – 16 September 1944
- Identification codes: M 50 425
- Commanders: Oblt.z.S. / Kptlt. Wolfgang Riekeberg; 25 March – 16 September 1944
- Operations: None
- Victories: None

German submarine U-1054 was a Type VIIC U-boat of Nazi Germany's Kriegsmarine during World War II.

== Construction ==
U-1054 was laid down on 30 March 1943 at the F. Krupp Germaniawerft AG yard in Kiel, Germany. She was launched on 24 February 1944 and commissioned on 25 March 1944 under the command of Oberleutnant zur See Wolfgang Riekeberg.

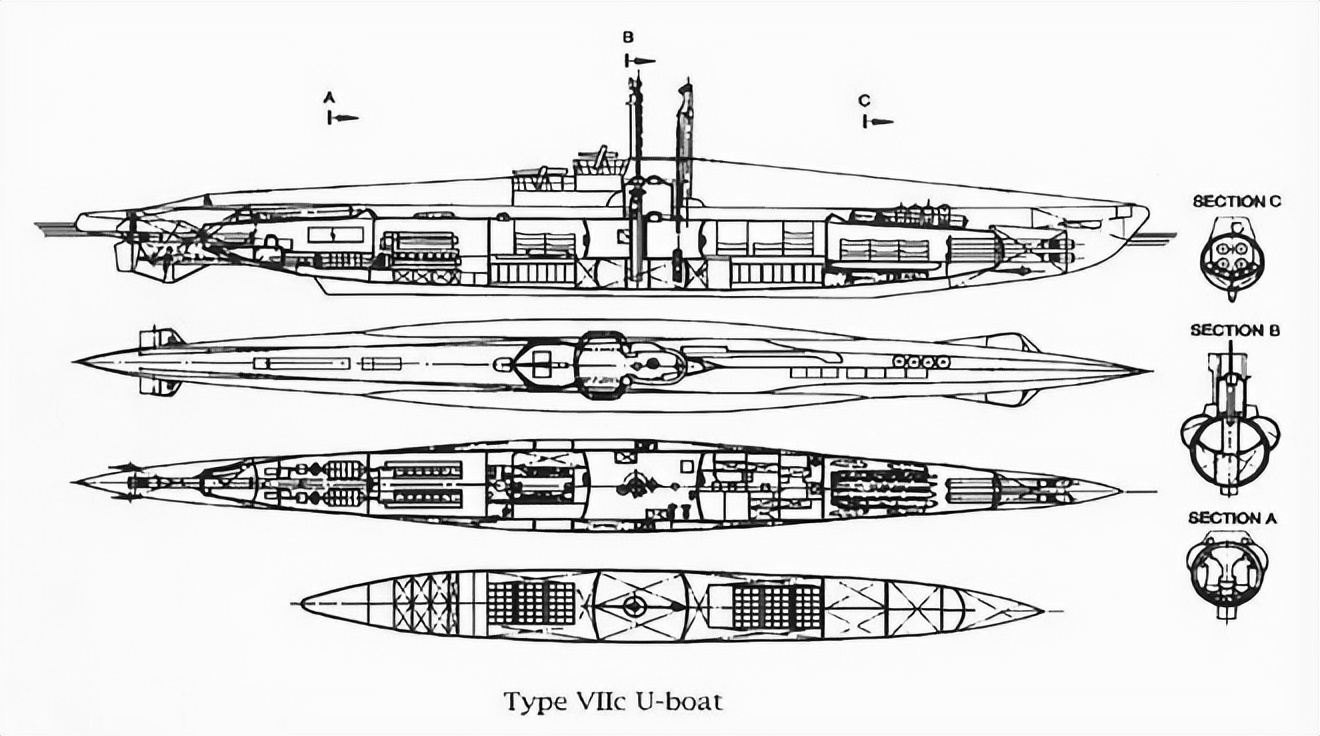
A cross-section of a Type VIIC U-boat.

When she was completed, the submarine was 67.10 metres (220 ft 2 in) long, with a beam of 6.18 metres (20 ft 3 in), a height of 9.60 metres (31 ft 6 in) and a draft of 4.74 metres (15 ft 7 in). She was assessed at 864.7 t (851 long tons) submerged. The submarine was powered by two Germaniawerft F46 four-stroke, six-cylinder supercharged diesel engines producing a total of 2,800 to 3,200 metric horsepower (2,060 to 2,350 kW; 2,760 to 3,160 shp) for use while surfaced and two AEG GU 460/8-276 double-acting electric motors producing a total of 750 metric horsepower (550 kW; 740 shp) for use while submerged. She had two shafts and two 1.23 m (4 ft) propellers. The submarine was capable of operating at depths of up to 230 metres (750 ft), had a maximum surface speed of 17.6 knots (32.6 km/h; 20.3 mph) and a maximum submerged speed of 7.5 knots (13.9 km/h; 8.6 mph).When submerged, the U-boat could operate for 80 nautical miles (150 km; 92 mi) at 4 knots (7.4 km/h; 4.6 mph) and when surfaced, she could travel 8,500 nautical miles (15,700 km; 9,800 mi) at 10 knots (19 km/h; 12 mph).

The submarine was fitted with five 53.3 cm (21 in) torpedo tubes (four fitted at the bow and one at the stern), fourteen torpedoes, one 8.8 cm (3.46 in) deck gun (220 rounds), one 3.7 cm (1.5 in) Flak M42 and two twin 2 cm (0.79 in) C/30 anti-aircraft guns. The boat had a complement of 44 to 57 men.

== Service history ==
U-1054 was used as a Training ship in the 5th U-boat Flotilla from 25 March 1944 until 16 September 1944, she was fitted with a Schnorchel underwater-breathing apparatus in March 1944.

== Accident and disposal ==
U-1054 was en route to Kiel on 18 August 1944 at 16:30, when she collided with the German hospital ship Peter Wessel in the Baltic Sea at 54°19′N 10°09′E. The submarine was towed to Kiel, where repairs were attempted from 22 August until 15 September 1944. On 16 September 1944, the submarine was decommissioned. She was originally going to be used for detonation tests, but instead remained in Kiel and was scrapped by British forces in May 1945.

== Bibliography ==
- Busch, Rainer; Röll, Hans-Joachim (1999). German U-boat commanders of World War II : a biographical dictionary. Translated by Brooks, Geoffrey. London, Annapolis, Md: Greenhill Books, Naval Institute Press. ISBN 1-55750-186-6.
- Gröner, Erich; Jung, Dieter; Maass, Martin (1991). German Warships 1815–1945, U-boats and Mine Warfare Vessels. Vol. 2. Translated by Thomas, Keith; Magowan, Rachel. London: Conway Maritime Press. ISBN 0-85177-593-4.
