= German submarine U-993 =

German World War II submarine

Coordinates: 60°23′31″N 5°17′32″E

- Type VIIC submarine U-570 which looked almost identical to U-993.

History

Nazi Germany
- Name: U-993
- Ordered: 25 May 1941
- Builder: Blohm & Voss, Hamburg
- Yard number: 193
- Laid down: 16 November 1942
- Launched: 8 July 1943
- Commissioned: 19 August 1943
- Fate: Sunk by British Air Raid on 4 October 1944

General characteristics
- Class & type: Type VIIC submarine
- Displacement: 864.7 t (851 long tons) submerged
- Length: 67.10 m (220 ft 2 in) o/a; 50.50 m (165 ft 8 in) pressure hull
- Beam: 6.18 m (20 ft 3 in) o/a; 4.68 m (15 ft 4 in) pressure hull
- Height: 9.60 m (31 ft 6 in)
- Draught: 4.74 m (15 ft 7 in)
- Installed power: 2,800–3,200 PS (2,100–2,400 kW; 2,800–3,200 bhp) (diesels); 750 PS (550 kW; 740 shp) (electric)
- Propulsion: 2 shafts; 2 × 4-stroke M6V 40/46 Germaniawerft; 2 x 62 batteries; 2 x six-cylinder supercharged diesel engines; 2 × electric motors
- Speed: 17.6 knots (32.6 km/h; 20.3 mph) surfaced; 7.5 knots (13.9 km/h; 8.6 mph) submerged
- Range: 8,500 nmi (15,700 km; 9,800 mi) at 10 knots (19 km/h; 12 mph) surfaced; 80 nmi (150 km; 92 mi) at 4 knots (7.4 km/h; 4.6 mph) submerged
- Test depth: 220 m (720 ft); Crush depth: 250–295 m (820–968 ft)
- Complement: 44–57 crew
- Armament: 5 × 53.3 cm (21 in) torpedo tubes (four bow, one stern); 14 × torpedoes; 1 × 8.8 cm (3.46 in) deck gun (220 rounds); 1 x 3.7 cm (1.5 in) Flak M42 anti-aircraft gun

Service record
- Part of: 5th U-boat Flotilla; 19 August 1943 – 29 February 1944; 3rd U-boat Flotilla; 1 March – 4 October 1944
- Identification codes: M 55 038
- Commanders: Oblt.z.S. Kurt Hilbig; 19 August 1943 – August 1944; Oblt.z.S. Karl-Heinz Steinmetz; 17 August – 4 October 1944
- Operations: 3 patrols: 1st patrol: 23 March – 22 April 1944; 2nd patrol: 6 – 14 June 1944; 3rd patrol: 17 August – 18 September 1944
- Victories: None

German submarine U-993 was a Type VIIC U-boat of Nazi Germany's Kriegsmarine during World War II.

== Construction ==
The U-993 was laid down on 16 November 1942 at the Blohm & Voss yard in Hamburg, Germany. She was launched on 8 July 1943 and commissioned on 19 August 1943 under the command of Oberleutnant zur See Kurt Hilbig, who was replaced on 17 August 1944 by Oberleutnant zur See Karl-Heinz Steinmetz. Her U-boat emblem was 13 and Clover.

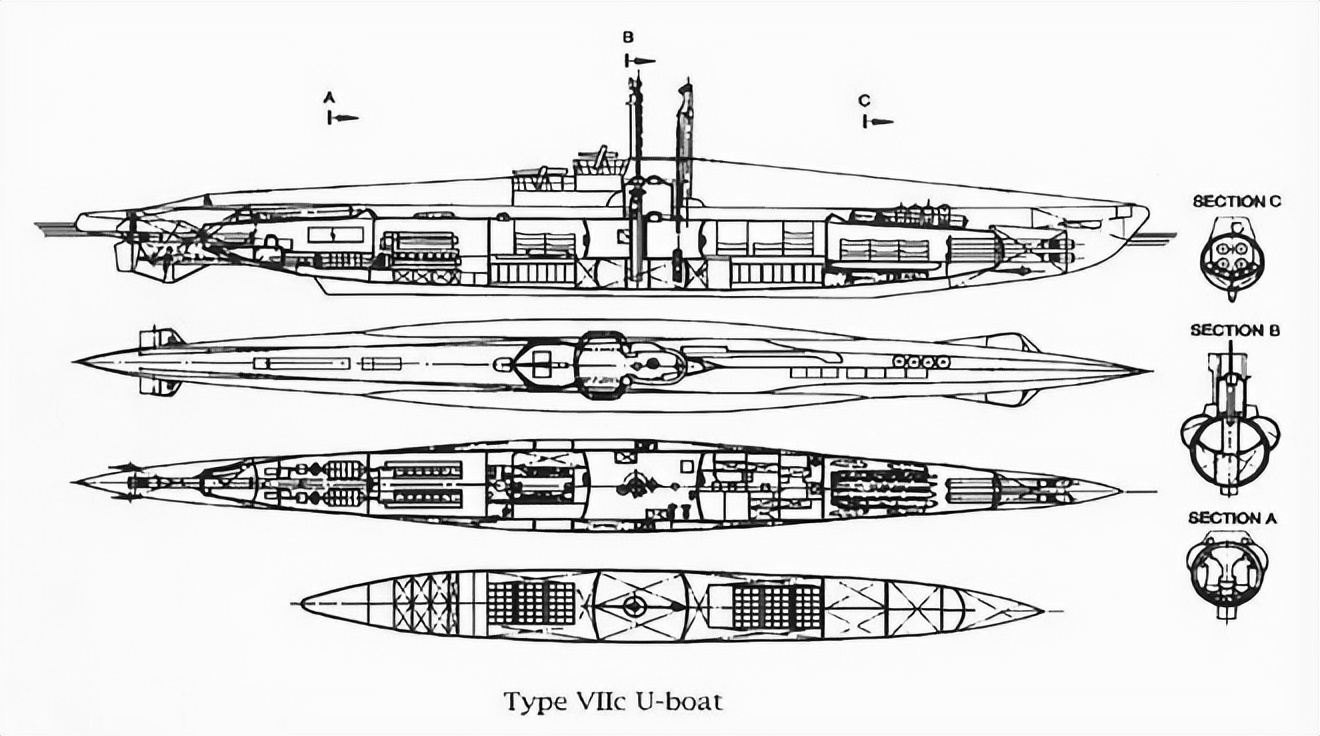
A cross-section of a Type VIIC U-boat.

When she was completed, the submarine was 67.10 metres (220 ft 2 in) long, with a beam of 6.18 metres (20 ft 3 in), a height of 9.60 metres (31 ft 6 in) and a draft of 4.74 metres (15 ft 7 in). She was assessed at 864.7 t (851 long tons) submerged. The submarine was powered by two Germaniawerft F46 four-stroke, six-cylinder supercharged diesel engines producing a total of 2,800 to 3,200 metric horsepower (2,060 to 2,350 kW; 2,760 to 3,160 shp) for use while surfaced and two BBC GG UB 720/8 double-acting electric motors producing a total of 750 metric horsepower (550 kW; 740 shp) for use while submerged. She had two shafts and two 1.23 m (4 ft) propellers. The submarine was capable of operating at depths of up to 230 metres (750 ft), had a maximum surface speed of 17.6 knots (32.6 km/h; 20.3 mph) and a maximum submerged speed of 7.5 knots (13.9 km/h; 8.6 mph).When submerged, the U-boat could operate for 80 nautical miles (150 km; 92 mi) at 4 knots (7.4 km/h; 4.6 mph) and when surfaced, she could travel 8,500 nautical miles (15,700 km; 9,800 mi) at 10 knots (19 km/h; 12 mph).

The submarine was fitted with five 53.3 cm (21 in) torpedo tubes (four fitted at the bow and one at the stern), fourteen torpedoes, one 8.8 cm (3.46 in) deck gun (220 rounds) and a 3.7 cm (1.5 in) Flak M42 anti-aircraft gun. The boat had a complement of 44 to 57 men.

== Service history ==
U-993 was used as a Training ship in the 5th U-boat Flotilla from 19 August 1943 until 29 February 1944 where she had been trained and tested at the individual commands (UAK, TEK, AGRU-Front, etc.) and had been part of Ausbildungsflottillen (26th U-boat Flotilla, 27th U-boat Flotilla, etc.) for remaining works and equipment, before serving in the 3rd U-boat Flotilla for active service on 1 March 1944.

=== Patrols And Incidents ===
During her active service, U-993 made 3 patrols. She left Marviken on 23 March 1944 for her first patrol and patrolled the North Atlantic between Ireland and Newfoundland. On 17 April 1944 at 3.51am, northwest of Cape Finisterre, U-993 was attacked by a British B-24 Liberator BZ945 (53 Sqdn RAF/O, pilot F/L L.M. Burton). The B-24 strafed the boat in a Leigh Light attack and dropped two depth charges and a small bomb on the submarine, which fell wide, causing no damage. The plane however wasn't so lucky as it was hit by flak during the approach, which set one of the port engines on fire. The plane crashed in the sea and exploded on impact approx. 600m (656 yds) from the submarine, all 11 aircrew were killed in the crash. The U-993 arrived in Lorient on 22 April 1944 without further incident, after a patrol of 31 days.

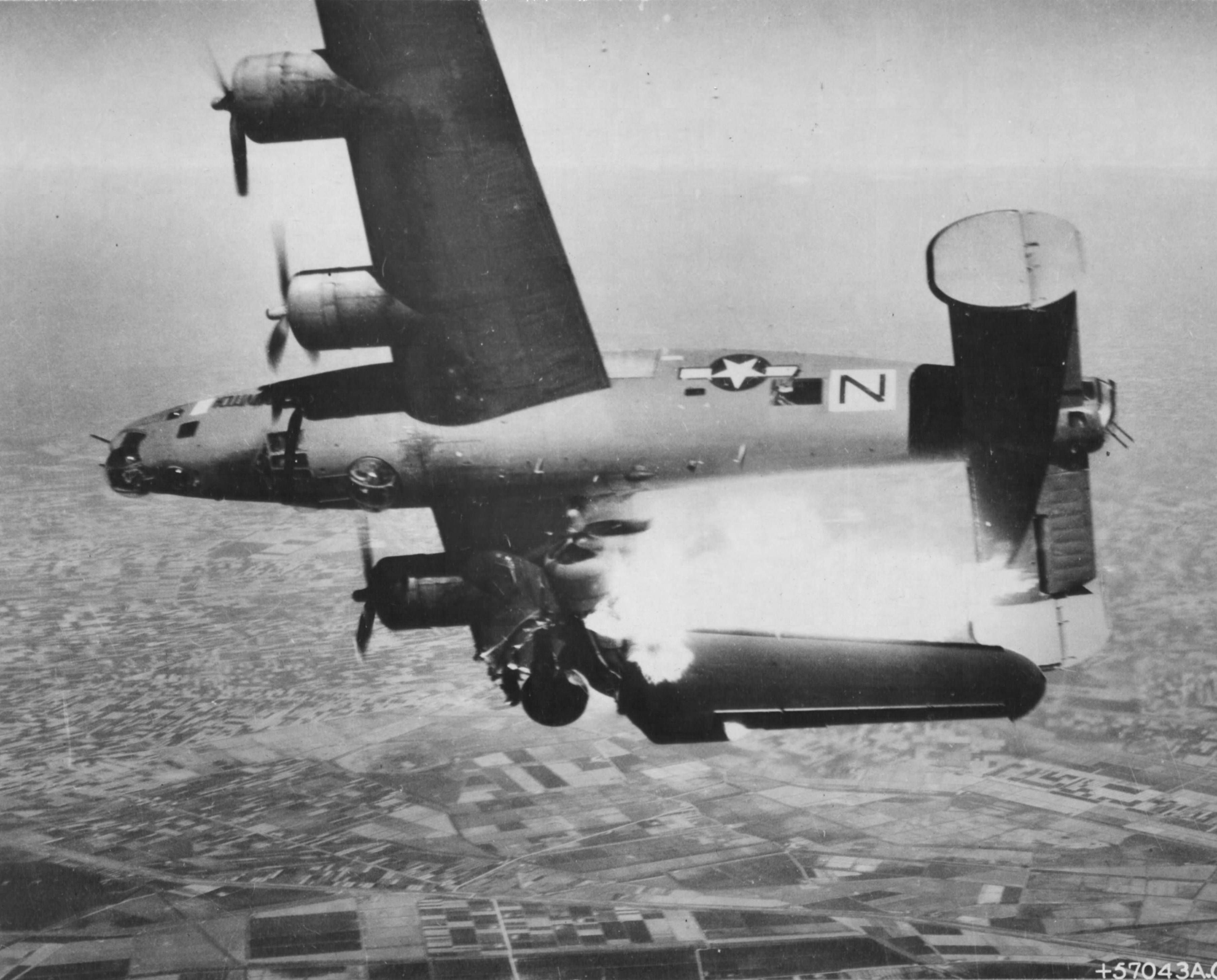
A B-24 hit by Flak, similar to the 1944 incident with the U-993

U-993 left Lorient for her second patrol on 6 June 1944 and patrolled the Atlantic Ocean, but she stayed close to the French coast. She arrived in Brest on 14 June 1944 after a patrol of 9 days.

The submarine left Brest for her third and last patrol on 17 August 1944 under the command of a new commander, Oberleutnant zur See Karl-Heinz Steinmetz. The submarine was also fitted with a Schnorchel underwater-breathing apparatus in August 1944. She patrolled the North Atlantic and sailed West off the coast of Ireland and north of the Faroe Islands. On 12 September 1944, a crew member died of jaundice in the North Atlantic. The submarine arrived Bergen on 18 September 1944 after a patrol of 33 days. In total, U-993 spend 76 days at sea.

== Sinking ==
On 4 October 1944, U-993 was stationed in the Laksevaag shipyard at Bergen, Norway. At 9.30am, 47 Lancaster Bomber and 93 Halifax bomber of 6 RCAF and 8 RAF Group threw a total of 603 bombs which each weight 1000 pounds on the port of Bergen. Seven bombs hit the submarine bunker, but focused on the thick reinforced concrete slabs resulted in almost no damage. Only the electrical wiring was destroyed and the repair yards were severely damaged.

However, U-993 and U-228 both capsized and sank in a floating dock outside the bunker and U-92 and U-437 were so badly damaged that they had to be decommissioned. Twenty of the Allied machinery had received specific objective instructions for damaging and/or destroying unprotected submarines in the port. One man died on U-993 and another man died the following day of his injuries; the survivor count is unknown. The submarine was later salvaged and decommissioned. After the war in May 1945, the submarine was captured by British forces and broken up.

== Bibliography ==
- Gröner, Erich; Jung, Dieter; Maass, Martin (1991). U-boats and Mine Warfare Vessels. German Warships 1815–1945. Vol. 2. Translated by Thomas, Keith; Magowan, Rachel. London: Conway Maritime Press. ISBN 0-85177-593-4.
