= Gerhard Thäter =

German naval officer (1916–2004)

- Born: 18 November 1916; Kiel
- Died: 15 February 2004 (aged 87); Wilhelmshaven
- Military career
- Allegiance: Nazi Germany (to 1945); West Germany
- Branch: Kriegsmarine; German Navy
- Service years: 1936–1945; 1956–1960s
- Rank: Kapitänleutnant
- Units: 3rd U-boat Flotilla; 5th U-boat Flotilla; 8th U-boat Flotilla; 29th U-boat Flotilla
- Commands: U-466, June 1942 – August 1944; U-3506, October 1944 – May 1945
- Conflicts: World War II; Battle of the Atlantic; Mediterranean campaign
- Awards: German Cross in Gold; U-boat War Badge
- Other work: Diplomatic Naval attaché to Ottawa

Gerhard Thäter (18 November 1916 – 15 February 2004) was a German naval officer.

Entering the Kriegsmarine in 1936 he served in the submarine branch and as commander of U-466 and U-3506 saw action during the Second World War.

When the Federal Republic of Germany established her own armed forces in 1956, Thäter joined the Bundesmarine. In the course of his service he was made Naval Attaché to West Germany's embassy at Ottawa, Canada.

On 15 February 2004 Thäter died in Wilhelmshaven, Germany.

== Bibliography ==
- Busch, Rainer; Röll, Hans-Joachim (1999b). German U-boat commanders of World War II : a biographical dictionary. Translated by Brooks, Geoffrey. London, Annapolis, Md: Greenhill Books, Naval Institute Press. ISBN 1-55750-186-6.

== Awards ==
Gerhard Thäter's awards include the German Cross in Gold for repeated acts of bravery, the Iron Cross Second Class, and the U-Boat War Badge.
