= German submarine U-991 =

German World War II submarine

- Type VIIC submarine U-570 which looked almost identical to U-991.

History

Nazi Germany
- Name: U-991
- Ordered: 25 May 1941
- Builder: Blohm & Voss, Hamburg
- Yard number: 191
- Laid down: 30 October 1942
- Launched: 24 June 1943
- Commissioned: 29 July 1943
- Fate: Surrendered on 9 May 1945; Sunk on 11 December 1945 during Operation Deadlight

General characteristics
- Class & type: Type VIIC submarine
- Displacement: 864.7 t (851 long tons) submerged
- Length: 67.10 m (220 ft 2 in) o/a; 50.50 m (165 ft 8 in) pressure hull
- Beam: 6.18 m (20 ft 3 in) o/a; 4.68 m (15 ft 4 in) pressure hull
- Height: 9.60 m (31 ft 6 in)
- Draught: 4.74 m (15 ft 7 in)
- Installed power: 2,800–3,200 PS (2,100–2,400 kW; 2,800–3,200 bhp) (diesels); 750 PS (550 kW; 740 shp) (electric)
- Propulsion: 2 shafts; 2 × 4-stroke M6V 40/46 Germaniawerft; 2 x 62 batteries; 2 x six-cylinder supercharged diesel engines; 2 × electric motors
- Speed: 17.6 knots (32.6 km/h; 20.3 mph) surfaced; 7.5 knots (13.9 km/h; 8.6 mph) submerged
- Range: 8,500 nmi (15,700 km; 9,800 mi) at 10 knots (19 km/h; 12 mph) surfaced; 80 nmi (150 km; 92 mi) at 4 knots (7.4 km/h; 4.6 mph) submerged
- Test depth: 220 m (720 ft); Crush depth: 250–295 m (820–968 ft)
- Complement: 44–57 crew
- Armament: 5 × 53.3 cm (21 in) torpedo tubes (four bow, one stern); 14 × torpedoes; 1 × 8.8 cm (3.46 in) deck gun (220 rounds); 1 x 3.7 cm (1.5 in) Flak M42 anti-aircraft gun

Service record
- Part of: 5th U-boat Flotilla; 29 July 1943 – 31 August 1944; 11th U-boat Flotilla; 1 September 1944 – 8 May 1945
- Identification codes: M 54 105
- Commanders: Oblt.z.S. / Kptlt. Diethelm Balke; 29 July 1943 – 9 May 1945
- Operations: 1 patrol: a. 15 October – 26 December 1944; b. 27 – 29 December 1944; c. 2 – 4 January 1945; d. 20 – 27 April 1945; e. 29 April – 4 May 1945
- Victories: None

German submarine U-991 was a Type VIIC U-boat of Nazi Germany's Kriegsmarine during World War II.

== Construction ==
The U-991 was laid down on 30 October 1942 at the Blohm & Voss yard in Hamburg, Germany. She was launched on 24 June 1943 and commissioned on 29 July 1943 under the command of Oberleutnant zur See Diethelm Balke. Her U-boat emblem was a diving eagle.

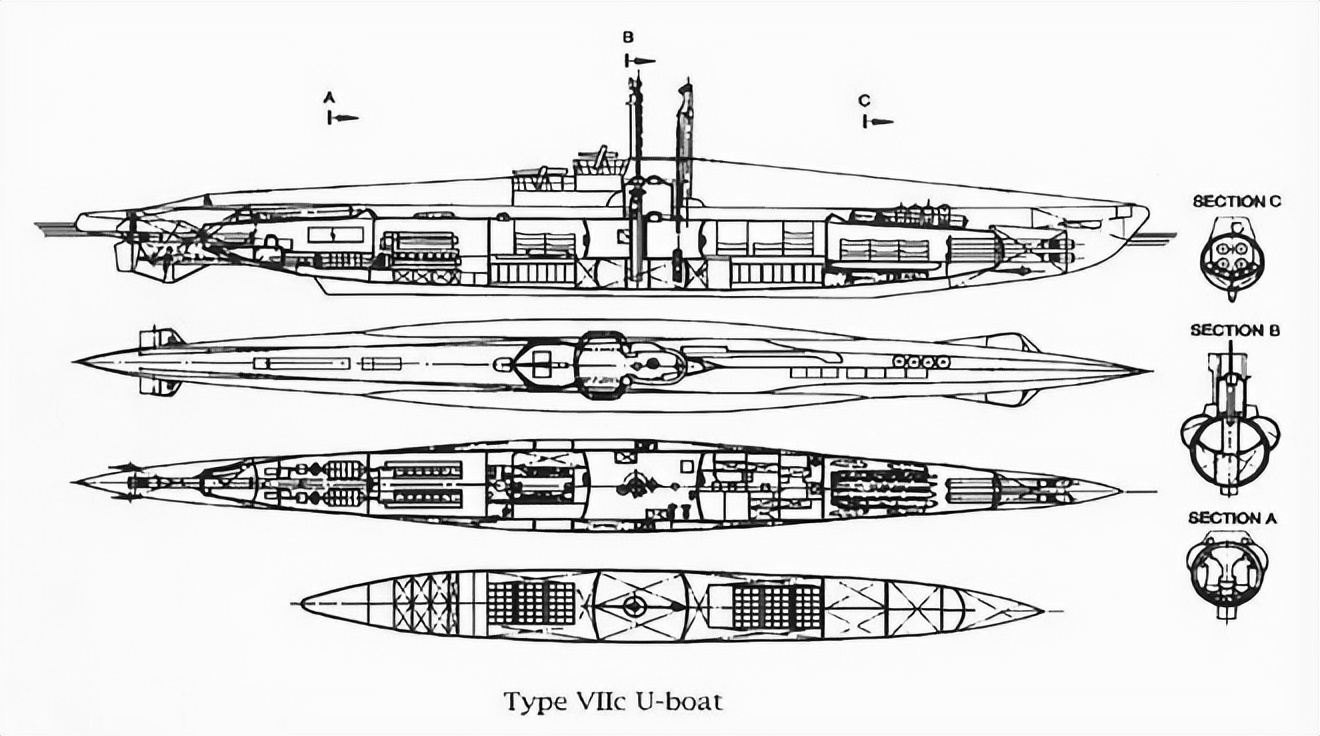
A cross-section of a Type VIIC U-boat.

When she was completed, the submarine was 67.10 metres (220 ft 2 in) long, with a beam of 6.18 metres (20 ft 3 in), a height of 9.60 metres (31 ft 6 in) and a draft of 4.74 metres (15 ft 7 in). She was assessed at 864.7 t (851 long tons) submerged. The submarine was powered by two Germaniawerft F46 four-stroke, six-cylinder supercharged diesel engines producing a total of 2,800 to 3,200 metric horsepower (2,060 to 2,350 kW; 2,760 to 3,160 shp) for use while surfaced and two BBC GG UB 720/8 double-acting electric motors producing a total of 750 metric horsepower (550 kW; 740 shp) for use while submerged. She had two shafts and two 1.23 m (4 ft) propellers. The submarine was capable of operating at depths of up to 230 metres (750 ft), had a maximum surface speed of 17.6 knots (32.6 km/h; 20.3 mph) and a maximum submerged speed of 7.5 knots (13.9 km/h; 8.6 mph).When submerged, the U-boat could operate for 80 nautical miles (150 km; 92 mi) at 4 knots (7.4 km/h; 4.6 mph) and when surfaced, she could travel 8,500 nautical miles (15,700 km; 9,800 mi) at 10 knots (19 km/h; 12 mph).

The submarine was fitted with five 53.3 cm (21 in) torpedo tubes (four fitted at the bow and one at the stern), fourteen torpedoes, one 8.8 cm (3.46 in) deck gun (220 rounds) and a 3.7 cm (1.5 in) Flak M42 anti-aircraft gun. The boat had a complement of 44 to 57 men.

== Service history ==
U-991 was used as a Training ship in the 5th U-boat Flotilla from 29 July 1943 until 31 August 1944 before serving in the 11th U-boat Flotilla for active service on 1 September 1944.

=== Training and tests ===
During U-991's service as a training ship, she completed a number of trainings and tests for the Kriegsmarine.

Date	Place	Activity
30 July – 19 August 1943	Keel	Trials at UAK
20 August 1943	Sonderborg	Auscultation at UAK
22 – 26 August 1943	Swinemünde	Flakausbildung at Flakschule
27 – 29 August 1943	Danzig	Trials at UAK
30 August – 4 September 1943	Hela	Front training at AGRU-Front
5 September 1943 – 5 February 1944	Flensburg	School boat
9 February – 11 May 1944	Hela	Front training at AGRU-Front
12 – 23 May 1944	Pillau	Torpedo shooting at the 26th U-boat Flotilla
24 May – 4 June 1944	Gotenhafen	Tactical Training at the 27th U-boat Flotilla
5 – 8 June 1944	Baltic Sea	March over Königsberg to Stettin. Equipment for the company Wallenstein
10 June – 14 August 1944	Königsberg	Remaining work in F. Schichau yard
15 – 16 August 1944	Danzig	Trials at UAK
21 – 26 August 1944	Swinemünde	Flakausbildung at Flakschule
29 August – 12 September 1944	Königsberg	Installation of a Schnorchel underwater-breathing apparatus
13 – 20 September 1944	Hela	Snorkel training at AGRU-Front
21 – 22 September 1944	Rönne	Auscultation at AUK
23 – 29 September 1944	Keel	Remaining work and equipment to the 1st company

=== Active Service ===
During her active service, U-991 made 1 patrol and left Kristiansand on 15 October 1944. Her patrol lasted 73 days and U-991 patrolled the North Atlantic from Norway, around the United Kingdom and Ireland and also to France before returning to Bergen. She arrived in Bergen on 26 December 1944, which marked the end of her first and only patrol during World War II.

Date	Port of Departure	Port of Arrival	Duration
5 – 7 October 1944	Kiel	Horten	3 days
11 – 12 October 1944	Horten	Kristiansand	2 days
15 October – 26 December 1944	Kristiansand	Bergen	73 days (Patrol)
27 – 29 December 1944	Bergen	Marviken	3 days
2 – 4 January 1945	Marviken	Flensburg	3 days
20 – 27 April 1945	Kiel	Horten	8 days
29 April – 4 May 1945	Horten	Bergen	6 days

In total, the U-991 spend 98 days at sea during her active service until 9 May 1945.

== Capture And End ==
U-991 surrendered on 9 May 1945 at Bergen, Norway to the Allied Forces. The submarine was transferred from Bergen to Scapa Flow on 2 June 1945 and from Scapa Flow to Loch Ryan on 5 June 1945. She stayed in Loch Ryan for her immersion in Operation Deadlight (post-war Allied operation) until 11 December 1945, when she was towed to sea by the British Navy tug HMS Freedom (W.139).

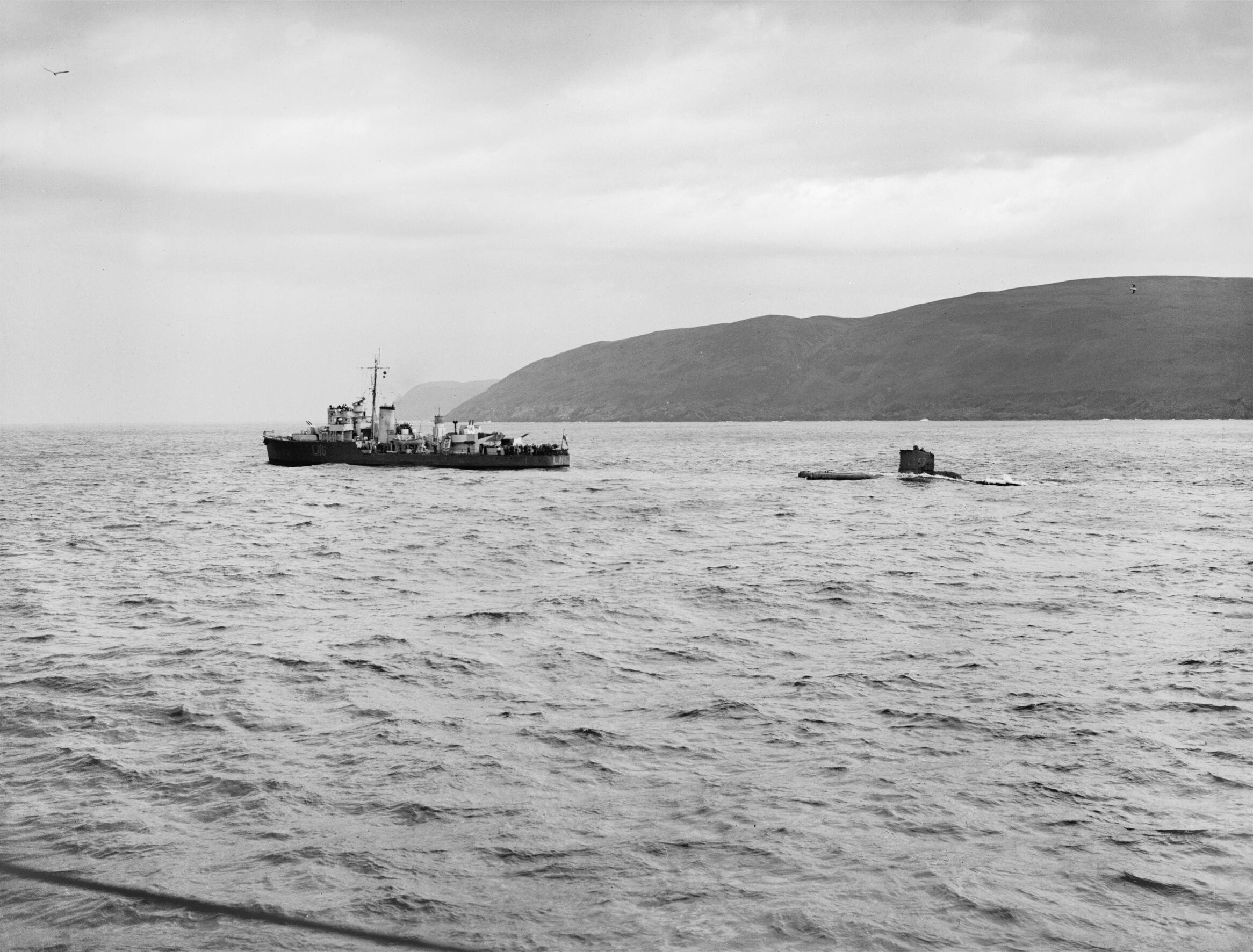
The U-2377 taken to sea to be scuttled during Operation Deadlight, the same fate was waiting for U-991.

U-991 was sunk at 12.15am on 11 December 1945 in the North Atlantic, North-West off the coast of Ireland by a torpedo from the British submarine HMS Tantivy. Her wreck still lies at 56°10′N 10°05′W.

== Bibliography ==
- Busch, Rainer; Röll, Hans-Joachim (1999). German U-boat commanders of World War II : a biographical dictionary. Translated by Brooks, Geoffrey. London, Annapolis, Md: Greenhill Books, Naval Institute Press. ISBN 1-55750-186-6.
- Gröner, Erich; Jung, Dieter; Maass, Martin (1991). U-boats and Mine Warfare Vessels. German Warships 1815–1945. Vol. 2. Translated by Thomas, Keith; Magowan, Rachel. London: Conway Maritime Press. ISBN 0-85177-593-4.
