= Robert-Richard Zapp =

German naval officer

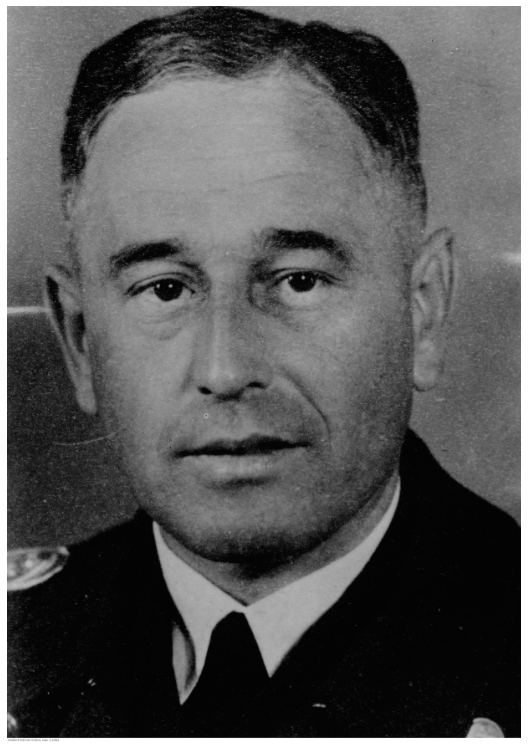
- Born: 3 April 1904; Germersheim
- Died: 17 July 1964 (aged 60); Kiel
- Military career
- Allegiance: Weimar Republic (to 1933); Nazi Germany (to 1945)
- Branch: Reichsmarine; Kriegsmarine
- Service years: 1923–45
- Rank: Fregattenkapitän
- Commands: U-66; 3rd U-boat Flotilla
- Conflicts: World War II
- Awards: Knight's Cross of the Iron Cross

Robert-Richard Zapp (3 April 1904 – 17 July 1964) was a German naval officer in World War II. As commander of the Type IXC U-boat U-66, he sank sixteen ships on five patrols, for a total of 106,200 tons of Allied shipping. He was a recipient of the Knight's Cross of the Iron Cross of Nazi Germany

== Career ==
Robert-Richard Zapp joined the Reichsmarine in May 1923. Before joining the U-boat service in 1939, he served aboard a minesweeper and later on took command of 251 Marineflak (Naval anti-aircraft artillery). After initial training, he served on board U-46 for a short while under Oberleutnant zur See Engelbert Endrass, with whom he participated in the battle against Convoy HX 79 in October 1940.

Zapp was appointed commander of U-66 in January 1941. U-66 was one of the boats that participated in the first wave of attacks in "Operation Drumbeat". On the first patrol of this operation, he sank five vessels, totalling 33,456 tons. On his second patrol off the eastern seaboard of the USA he sank six vessels totaling 43,946 tons. They included the 7,988 GRT Canadian passenger liner RMS Lady Hawkins on 19 January, whose final death toll was 251. Zapp was awarded the Knight's Cross of the Iron Cross on 23 April 1942.

In June 1942 he was posted ashore to become commander of 3rd U-boat Flotilla, based at La Rochelle, France. On 1 January 1945 he was promoted to Fregattenkapitän. In the last three months of the war, he became commander of Marine-Regiment Zapp and defended the U-boat base at La Rochelle until the very end of the war in May 1945. He spent over two years in French captivity and was released on 7 July 1947.

== Awards ==
- U-boat War Badge (14 May 1941)
- Iron Cross (1939)
  - 2nd Class (6 August 1941)
  - 1st Class (6 August 1941)
- War Merit Cross 2nd Class with Swords (30 January 1945)
- Knight's Cross of the Iron Cross on 23 April 1942 as Korvettenkapitän and commander of U-66

== Notes ==
Military offices
| Preceded by Kapitänleutnant Heinz von Reiche | Commander of 3rd U-boat Flotilla; June, 1942 – October, 1944 | Succeeded by disbanded |
