= German submarine U-466 =

German World War II submarine

History

Nazi Germany
- Name: U-466
- Ordered: 15 August 1940
- Builder: Deutsche Werke, Kiel
- Yard number: 297
- Laid down: 24 May 1941
- Launched: 30 March 1942
- Commissioned: 17 June 1942
- Home port: Kiel
- Identification: M 06 641
- Fate: Scuttled on 19 August 1944 at Toulon

General characteristics
- Class & type: Type VIIC submarine
- Displacement: 769 tonnes (757 long tons) surfaced; 871 t (857 long tons) submerged
- Length: 67.10 m (220 ft 2 in) o/a; 50.50 m (165 ft 8 in) pressure hull
- Beam: 6.20 m (20 ft 4 in) o/a; 4.70 m (15 ft 5 in) pressure hull
- Height: 9.60 m (31 ft 6 in)
- Draught: 4.74 m (15 ft 7 in)
- Installed power: 2,800–3,200 PS (2,100–2,400 kW; 2,800–3,200 bhp) (diesels); 750 PS (550 kW; 740 shp) (electric)
- Propulsion: 2 shafts; 2 × diesel engines; 2 × electric motors
- Speed: 17.7 knots (32.8 km/h; 20.4 mph) surfaced; 7.6 knots (14.1 km/h; 8.7 mph) submerged
- Range: 8,500 nmi (15,700 km; 9,800 mi) at 10 knots (19 km/h; 12 mph) surfaced; 80 nmi (150 km; 92 mi) at 4 knots (7.4 km/h; 4.6 mph) submerged
- Test depth: 230 m (750 ft); Crush depth: 250–295 m (820–968 ft)
- Complement: 4 officers, 40–56 enlisted
- Armament: 5 × 53.3 cm (21 in) torpedo tubes (four bow, one stern); 14 × torpedoes or 26 TMA mines; 1 × 8.8 cm (3.46 in) deck gun (220 rounds); 1 × twin 2 cm (0.79 in) C/30 anti-aircraft gun

Service record
- Part of: 5th U-boat Flotilla; 17 June – 31 December 1942; 3rd U-boat Flotilla; 1 January 1943 – 31 March 1944; 29th U-boat Flotilla; 1 April – 19 August 1944
- Identification codes: M 06 641
- Commanders: Kptlt. Gerhard Thäter; 17 June 1942 – 19 August 1944
- Operations: 5 patrols: 1st patrol: 12 January – 11 February 1943; 2nd patrol: 17 April – 26 May 1943; 3rd patrol: a. 29 June – 16 August 1943; b. 29 – 30 September 1943; 4th patrol: 16 October – 19 November 1943; 5th patrol: 4 – 30 March 1944
- Victories: None

German submarine U-466 was a Type VIIC U-boat built for Nazi Germany's Kriegsmarine for service during World War II. She was scuttled at sea on 19 August 1944.

She was laid down on 24 May 1941 by Deutsche Werke AG in Kiel as yard number 297, launched on 30 March 1942 and commissioned under Kapitänleutnant Gerhard Thäter, who remained with her for the rest of her career. U-466 bore a "heart & sunburst" emblem on her conning tower.

She began her service life in the 5th U-boat Flotilla, a training organization, before moving on to the 3rd and 29th flotillas for operational duties.

U-466 undertook five war patrols, spending a total of 182 days at sea, with no ships sunk or damaged. She was a member of six wolfpacks.

== Design ==
German Type VIIC submarines were preceded by the shorter Type VIIB submarines. U-466 had a displacement of 769 tonnes (757 long tons) when at the surface and 871 tonnes (857 long tons) while submerged. She had a total length of 67.10 m (220 ft 2 in), a pressure hull length of 50.50 m (165 ft 8 in), a beam of 6.20 m (20 ft 4 in), a height of 9.60 m (31 ft 6 in), and a draught of 4.74 m (15 ft 7 in). The submarine was powered by two Germaniawerft F46 four-stroke, six-cylinder supercharged diesel engines producing a total of 2,800 to 3,200 metric horsepower (2,060 to 2,350 kW; 2,760 to 3,160 shp) for use while surfaced, two Siemens-Schuckert GU 343/38–8 double-acting electric motors producing a total of 750 metric horsepower (550 kW; 740 shp) for use while submerged. She had two shafts and two 1.23 m (4 ft) propellers. The boat was capable of operating at depths of up to 230 metres (750 ft).

The submarine had a maximum surface speed of 17.7 knots (32.8 km/h; 20.4 mph) and a maximum submerged speed of 7.6 knots (14.1 km/h; 8.7 mph). When submerged, the boat could operate for 80 nautical miles (150 km; 92 mi) at 4 knots (7.4 km/h; 4.6 mph); when surfaced, she could travel 8,500 nautical miles (15,700 km; 9,800 mi) at 10 knots (19 km/h; 12 mph). U-466 was fitted with five 53.3 cm (21 in) torpedo tubes (four fitted at the bow and one at the stern), fourteen torpedoes, one 8.8 cm (3.46 in) SK C/35 naval gun, 220 rounds, and one twin 2 cm (0.79 in) C/30 anti-aircraft gun. The boat had a complement of between forty-four and sixty.

== Service history ==
=== First and second patrols ===
The U-boat departed Kiel for her first patrol on 12 January 1943. She made her way to the Atlantic from Kiel through the so-called Faeroes gap - the stretch of water between Iceland and the Faeroe Islands. She arrived in La Pallice in occupied France via a spot southeast of Greenland on the 29th.

Her second sortie also took her out into the mid-Atlantic. She departed La Pallice on 17 April 1943 and returned to the same place on 26 May after 40 days at sea.

=== Third and fourth patrols ===
Her third foray took her to a point off Suriname in South America. She was unsuccessfully attacked by US B-18 'Bolo' and B-24 Liberator aircraft on 23 July 1943. A day later, she was attacked by a B-24 which dropped five depth charges. This time the boat sustained damage. Five men were wounded, including the first officer.

The boat's fourth patrol was cut short when she was badly damaged following an attack by escort vessels from Convoy MKS 29. The submarine returned to her French base on 19 November 1943 after only 35 days away.

=== Fifth patrol ===
Her fifth patrol involved the U-boat's passage to Toulon in southern France. This voyage included trafficking the heavily defended Strait of Gibraltar. She passed the Rock on 22 March 1944 and arrived in Toulon on the 30th, having been attacked by the British submarine HMS Uproar. The vessel fired four torpedoes at the U-boat; they all missed.

=== Loss ===
U-466 was severely damaged in a United States Army Air Forces raid on Toulon. As a result, she was scuttled on 19 August 1944 following the Allied invasion of southern France (Operation Dragoon). She was the last U-boat to be scuttled in the Mediterranean.

=== Wolfpacks ===
U-466 took part in six wolfpacks, namely:

- Haudegen (26 – 29 January 1943)
- Amsel (22 April – 3 May 1943)
- Amsel 4 (3 – 6 May 1943)
- Rhein (7 – 10 May 1943)
- Elbe 2 (10 – 13 May 1943)
- Schill (25 October – 10 November 1943)

== See also ==
- Mediterranean U-boat Campaign (World War II)

== Bibliography ==
- Busch, Rainer; Röll, Hans-Joachim (1999). German U-boat commanders of World War II : a biographical dictionary. Translated by Brooks, Geoffrey. London, Annapolis, Md: Greenhill Books, Naval Institute Press. ISBN 1-55750-186-6.
- Busch, Rainer; Röll, Hans-Joachim (1999). Deutsche U-Boot-Verluste von September 1939 bis Mai 1945 [German U-boat losses from September 1939 to May 1945]. Der U-Boot-Krieg (in German). Vol. IV. Hamburg, Berlin, Bonn: Mittler. ISBN 3-8132-0514-2.
- Gröner, Erich; Jung, Dieter; Maass, Martin (1991). U-boats and Mine Warfare Vessels. German Warships 1815–1945. Vol. 2. Translated by Thomas, Keith; Magowan, Rachel. London: Conway Maritime Press. ISBN 0-85177-593-4.
- Kemp, Paul (1999). U-Boats Destroyed - German Submarine Losses in the World Wars. London: Arms & Armour. ISBN 1-85409-515-3.
