= German submarine U-478 =

German World War II submarine

History

Nazi Germany
- Name: U-478
- Ordered: 10 April 1941
- Builder: Deutsche Werke, Kiel
- Yard number: 309
- Laid down: 28 October 1942
- Launched: 17 July 1943
- Commissioned: 8 September 1943
- Fate: Sunk on 30 June 1944

General characteristics
- Class & type: Type VIIC submarine
- Displacement: 769 tonnes (757 long tons) surfaced; 871 t (857 long tons) submerged
- Length: 67.10 m (220 ft 2 in) o/a; 50.50 m (165 ft 8 in) pressure hull
- Beam: 6.20 m (20 ft 4 in) o/a; 4.70 m (15 ft 5 in) pressure hull
- Height: 9.60 m (31 ft 6 in)
- Draught: 4.74 m (15 ft 7 in)
- Installed power: 2,800–3,200 PS (2,100–2,400 kW; 2,800–3,200 bhp) (diesels); 750 PS (550 kW; 740 shp) (electric)
- Propulsion: 2 shafts; 2 × diesel engines; 2 × electric motors.
- Speed: 17.7 knots (32.8 km/h; 20.4 mph) surfaced; 7.6 knots (14.1 km/h; 8.7 mph) submerged
- Range: 8,500 nmi (15,700 km; 9,800 mi) at 10 knots (19 km/h; 12 mph) surfaced; 80 nmi (150 km; 92 mi) at 4 knots (7.4 km/h; 4.6 mph) submerged
- Test depth: 230 m (750 ft); Crush depth: 250–295 m (820–968 ft)
- Complement: 4 officers, 40–56 enlisted
- Armament: 5 × 53.3 cm (21 in) torpedo tubes (four bow, one stern); 14 × torpedoes or 26 TMA mines; 1 × 3.7 cm (1.5 in) Flak M42 AA gun; 2 × twin 2 cm (0.79 in) C/30 anti-aircraft guns

Service record
- Part of: 5th U-boat Flotilla; 8 September 1943 – 1 June 1944; 3rd U-boat Flotilla; 1 – 30 June 1944
- Identification codes: M 52 306
- Commanders: Oblt.z.S. Rudolf Rademacher; 8 September 1943 – 30 June 1944
- Operations: 1 patrol: 25 – 30 June 1944
- Victories: None

German submarine U-478 was a Type VIIC U-boat of Nazi Germany's Kriegsmarine during World War II.

She carried out one patrol. She sank no ships.

She was sunk by a Canadian and a British aircraft northeast of the Faroe Islands on 30 June 1944.

== Design ==
German Type VIIC submarines were preceded by the shorter Type VIIB submarines. U-478 had a displacement of 769 tonnes (757 long tons) when at the surface and 871 tonnes (857 long tons) while submerged. She had a total length of 67.10 m (220 ft 2 in), a pressure hull length of 50.50 m (165 ft 8 in), a beam of 6.20 m (20 ft 4 in), a height of 9.60 m (31 ft 6 in), and a draught of 4.74 m (15 ft 7 in). The submarine was powered by two Germaniawerft F46 four-stroke, six-cylinder supercharged diesel engines producing a total of 2,800 to 3,200 metric horsepower (2,060 to 2,350 kW; 2,760 to 3,160 shp) for use while surfaced, two Siemens-Schuckert GU 343/38–8 double-acting electric motors producing a total of 750 metric horsepower (550 kW; 740 shp) for use while submerged. She had two shafts and two 1.23 m (4 ft) propellers. The boat was capable of operating at depths of up to 230 metres (750 ft).

The submarine had a maximum surface speed of 17.7 knots (32.8 km/h; 20.4 mph) and a maximum submerged speed of 7.6 knots (14.1 km/h; 8.7 mph). When submerged, the boat could operate for 80 nautical miles (150 km; 92 mi) at 4 knots (7.4 km/h; 4.6 mph); when surfaced, she could travel 8,500 nautical miles (15,700 km; 9,800 mi) at 10 knots (19 km/h; 12 mph). U-478 was fitted with five 53.3 cm (21 in) torpedo tubes (four fitted at the bow and one at the stern), fourteen torpedoes, one 3.7 cm (1.5 in) Flak M42 and two twin 2 cm (0.79 in) C/30 anti-aircraft guns. The boat had a complement of between forty-four and sixty.

== Service history ==
The submarine was laid down on 28 October 1942 at the Deutsche Werke in Kiel as yard number 309, launched on 17 July 1943 and commissioned on 8 September under the command of Oberleutnant zur See Rudolf Rademacher.

She served with the 5th U-boat Flotilla from 8 September 1943 for training and the 3rd flotilla from 1 June 1944 for operations.

=== Patrol and loss ===
U-478's only patrol was preceded by a short trip from Kiel in Germany to Kristiansand in Norway. The patrol itself began with the boat's departure from Kristiansand on 25 June 1944.

On 30 June she was attacked and sunk by a Canadian Canso (the Canadian version of the PBY Catalina) flying boat of No. 162 Squadron RCAF and a British B-24 Liberator of No. 86 Squadron RAF northeast of the Faroe Islands.

Fifty-two men went down with U-478; there were no survivors.

== Bibliography ==
- Busch, Rainer; Röll, Hans-Joachim (1999). German U-boat commanders of World War II : a biographical dictionary. Translated by Brooks, Geoffrey. London, Annapolis, Md: Greenhill Books, Naval Institute Press. ISBN 1-55750-186-6.
- Busch, Rainer; Röll, Hans-Joachim (1999). Deutsche U-Boot-Verluste von September 1939 bis Mai 1945 [German U-boat losses from September 1939 to May 1945]. Der U-Boot-Krieg (in German). Vol. IV. Hamburg, Berlin, Bonn: Mittler. ISBN 3-8132-0514-2.
- Gröner, Erich; Jung, Dieter; Maass, Martin (1991). U-boats and Mine Warfare Vessels. German Warships 1815–1945. Vol. 2. Translated by Thomas, Keith; Magowan, Rachel. London: Conway Maritime Press. ISBN 0-85177-593-4.
- Kemp, Paul (1999). U-Boats Destroyed – German Submarine Losses in the World Wars. London: Arms & Armour. ISBN 1-85409-515-3.
