= 3rd U-boat Flotilla =

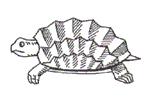
- Active: Raised 1937, Dissolved 1944
- Country: Nazi Germany
- Branch: Kriegsmarine
- Type: U-boat flotilla
- Garrison/HQ: Kiel, La Pallice
- Nickname(s): Lohs Flotilla

Commanders
- Notable commanders: Korvettenkapitän Hans-Rudolf Rösing; Kapitänleutnant Herbert Schultze; Korvettenkapitän Robert-Richard Zapp

The 3rd U-boat Flotilla (German 3. Unterseebootsflottille), also known as Lohs Flotilla, was the third operational U-boat unit in Nazi Germany's Kriegsmarine. Founded on 4 October 1937 under the command of Kapitänleutnant Hans Eckermann, it was named in honour of Oberleutnant zur See Johannes Lohs. Lohs, a U-boat commander during World War I, died on 14 August 1918 after his submarine UB-57 was sunk by a mine.

The flotilla, under the name "Lohs Flotilla", was founded in Kiel in June 1937 and existed until December 1939. The flotilla was re-founded as "3rd Flotilla" in March 1941 with its base in Kiel. In October 1941 the flotilla was moved to La Pallice, La Rochelle in France. In August 1944 the last U-boats left the base for Norway and the flotilla was disbanded in October 1944.

== Flotilla Commanders ==
Duration	Rank	Commander
October 1937 – December 1939	Kapitänleutnant	Hans Eckermann
March–July 1941	Korvettenkapitän	Hans-Rudolf Rösing
July 1941 – March 1942	Kapitänleutnant	Herbert Schultze
March–June 1942	Kapitänleutnant	Heinz von Reiche i.V.
June 1942 – October 1944	Korvettenkapitän	Robert-Richard Zapp

== U-Boats of the Flotilla ==
U-8	U-10	U-12	U-14	U-16	U-18	U-20
U-22	U-24	U-82	U-85	U-132	U-134	U-138
U-141	U-143	U-146	U-147	U-205	U-206	U-212
U-231	U-241	U-242	U-245	U-246	U-257	U-258
U-259	U-262	U-275	U-280	U-289	U-332	U-333
U-334	U-341	U-343	U-344	U-352	U-373	U-375
U-376	U-378	U-384	U-391	U-398	U-402	U-423
U-431	U-432	U-433	U-444	U-451	U-452	U-458
U-466	U-468	U-469	U-476	U-478	U-483	U-484
U-553	U-567	U-568	U-569	U-570	U-571	U-572
U-573	U-596	U-600	U-611	U-613	U-615	U-619
U-620	U-625	U-630	U-635	U-645	U-652	U-657
U-661	U-671	U-677	U-701	U-706	U-712	U-719
U-734	U-752	U-753	U-760	U-763	U-952	U-953
U-957	U-960	U-970	U-971	U-975	U-978	U-992
U-993	UD-1	UD-3	UD-4			
