= German submarine U-241 =

German World War II submarine

History

Nazi Germany
- Name: U-241
- Ordered: 10 April 1941
- Builder: Germaniawerft, Kiel
- Yard number: 675
- Laid down: 4 September 1942
- Launched: 25 June 1943
- Commissioned: 24 July 1943
- Fate: Sunk, 18 May 1944

General characteristics
- Class & type: Type VIIC submarine
- Displacement: 769 tonnes (757 long tons) surfaced; 871 t (857 long tons) submerged
- Length: 67.10 m (220 ft 2 in) o/a; 50.50 m (165 ft 8 in) pressure hull
- Beam: 6.20 m (20 ft 4 in) o/a; 4.70 m (15 ft 5 in) pressure hull
- Height: 9.60 m (31 ft 6 in)
- Draught: 4.72 m (15 ft 6 in)
- Installed power: 2,800–3,200 PS (2,100–2,400 kW; 2,800–3,200 bhp) (diesels); 750 PS (550 kW; 740 shp) (electric)
- Propulsion: 2 shafts; 2 × diesel engines; 2 × electric motors
- Speed: 17.7 knots (32.8 km/h; 20.4 mph) surfaced; 7.6 knots (14.1 km/h; 8.7 mph) submerged
- Range: 8,500 nmi (15,700 km; 9,800 mi) at 10 knots (19 km/h; 12 mph) surfaced; 80 nmi (150 km; 92 mi) at 4 knots (7.4 km/h; 4.6 mph) submerged
- Test depth: 230 m (750 ft); Calculated crush depth: 250–295 m (820–968 ft)
- Complement: 44–52 officers and ratings
- Armament: 5 × 53.3 cm (21 in) torpedo tubes (four bow, one stern); 14 × torpedoes or 26 TMA or 39 TMB mines; 1 × 8.8 cm (3.46 in) deck gun with 220 rounds; 1 × 3.7 cm (1.5 in) Flak M42 AA gun; 2 × twin 2 cm (0.79 in) C/30 anti-aircraft guns

Service record
- Part of: 5th U-boat Flotilla; 24 July 1943 – 31 March 1944; 3rd U-boat Flotilla; 1 April 1944 – 18 May 1944
- Identification codes: M 11 631
- Commanders: Lt.z.S. / Oblt.z.S. Arno Werr; 24 Jul 1943 – 18 May 1944
- Operations: 1 patrol: 13 – 18 May 1944
- Victories: None

The German submarine U-241 was a Type VIIC U-boat of Nazi Germany's Kriegsmarine during World War II. Four days into her first patrol, she shot down an attacking flying boat but was sunk with all hands the next day.

== Design ==
German Type VIIC submarines were preceded by the shorter Type VIIB submarines. U-241 had a displacement of 769 tonnes (757 long tons) when at the surface and 871 tonnes (857 long tons) while submerged. She had a total length of 67.10 m (220 ft 2 in), a pressure hull length of 50.50 m (165 ft 8 in), a beam of 6.20 m (20 ft 4 in), a height of 9.60 m (31 ft 6 in), and a draught of 4.74 m (15 ft 7 in). The submarine was powered by two Germaniawerft F46 four-stroke, six-cylinder supercharged diesel engines producing a total of 2,800 to 3,200 metric horsepower (2,060 to 2,350 kW; 2,760 to 3,160 shp) for use while surfaced, two AEG GU 460/8–27 double-acting electric motors producing a total of 750 metric horsepower (550 kW; 740 shp) for use while submerged. She had two shafts and two 1.23 m (4 ft) propellers. The boat was capable of operating at depths of up to 230 metres (750 ft).

The submarine had a maximum surface speed of 17.7 knots (32.8 km/h; 20.4 mph) and a maximum submerged speed of 7.6 knots (14.1 km/h; 8.7 mph). When submerged, the boat could operate for 80 nautical miles (150 km; 92 mi) at 4 knots (7.4 km/h; 4.6 mph); when surfaced, she could travel 8,500 nautical miles (15,700 km; 9,800 mi) at 10 knots (19 km/h; 12 mph). U-241 was fitted with five 53.3 cm (21 in) torpedo tubes (four fitted at the bow and one at the stern), fourteen torpedoes, one 8.8 cm (3.46 in) SK C/35 naval gun, (220 rounds), one 3.7 cm (1.5 in) Flak M42 and two twin 2 cm (0.79 in) C/30 anti-aircraft guns. The boat had a complement of between forty-four and sixty.

== Service history ==
An order was placed for U-241 on 10 April 1941 and construction began on 4 September 1942 at Germaniawerft, Kiel, as yard number 675. She was launched the following year on 25 June 1943 and commissioned under the command of Oberleutnant zur See Arno Werr a month later on 24 July.

U-241 began training with the 5th U-boat Flotilla on 24 July 1943, the day that the U-boat was commissioned . U-241 remained with the 5th U-boat Flotilla until 31 March 1944, when her training was complete.

U-241 began the first and only patrol of her career on 1 April 1944. She was assigned as a front (operational) boat to the 3rd U-boat Flotilla and left her original home port of Kiel on 23 April of that year. She arrived in Kristiansand in occupied Norway the next day, on 24 April. On 30 April, U-241 left Kristiansand for her new home port of Bergen, which she arrived at on 4 May 1944. On 13 May, U-241 left Norway for the North Sea.

On 17 May, just four days after leaving port, the boat came under attack from a Norwegian Catalina flying boat from No. 333 Squadron RAF. The incident occurred at 22:21 about 125 miles west of Ålesund, Norway. Anti-aircraft fire from the submarine hit the aircraft during its attack run and caused the Catalina's depth charges to miss their intended target. One of the AA gunners also managed to shoot a large hole in the hull of the aircraft. Although the plane was able to return to Britain the pilot was forced to make an emergency landing in the River Tay in Scotland before he could reach his base at Woodhaven, Fife. During the landing the plane suffered damage beyond all possible repair and the pilot was forced to beach it.

Although U-241 defended herself on that occasion, she was attacked with depth charges by another Catalina, this time from 210 Squadron, the following day. This resulted in the sinking of the submarine with the loss of all 51 crew members.

== Disputed fate ==
According to a book Steuermann durch Krieg und Frieden ('Helmsman through War and Peace') by Hans Schmid, the author and two other men survived the sinking, were rescued and taken prisoner. All sources for 'uboat.net' state that there were no survivors.

== Bibliography ==
- Busch, Rainer; Röll, Hans-Joachim (1999). German U-boat commanders of World War II: a biographical dictionary. Translated by Brooks, Geoffrey. London, Annapolis, Md: Greenhill Books, Naval Institute Press. ISBN 1-55750-186-6.
- Busch, Rainer; Röll, Hans-Joachim (1999). Deutsche U-Boot-Verluste von September 1939 bis Mai 1945 [German U-boat losses from September 1939 to May 1945]. Der U-Boot-Krieg (in German). Vol. IV. Hamburg, Berlin, Bonn: Mittler. ISBN 3-8132-0514-2.
- Gröner, Erich; Jung, Dieter; Maass, Martin (1991). U-boats and Mine Warfare Vessels. German Warships 1815–1945. Vol. 2. Translated by Thomas, Keith; Magowan, Rachel. London: Conway Maritime Press. ISBN 0-85177-593-4.
- Kemp, Paul (1999). U-Boats Destroyed - German Submarine Losses in the World Wars. London: Arms & Armour. ISBN 1-85409-515-3.
- Williamson, Gordon; Palmer, Ian (2002). Kriegsmarine U-boats 1939-45: Vol 2. Osprey. ISBN 1-84176-364-0.
