= HMS Uproar =

Submarine of the Royal Navy

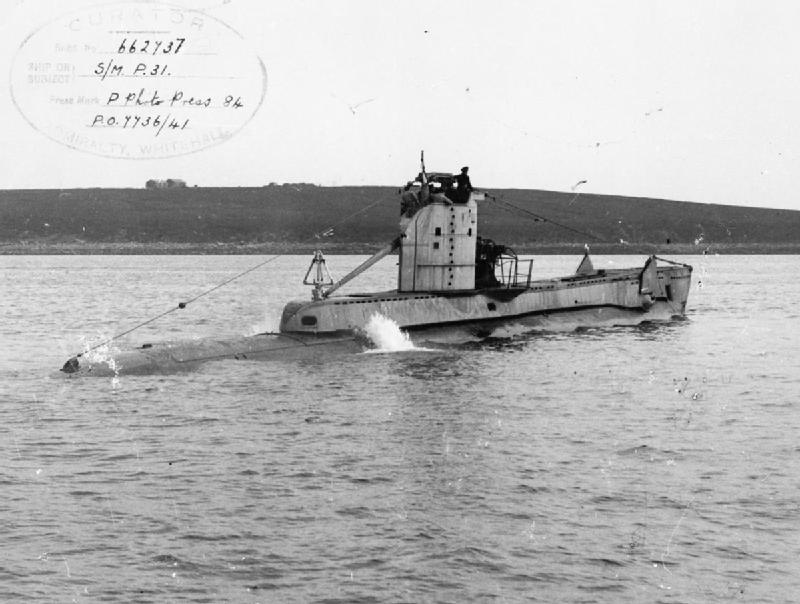

History

United Kingdom
- Name: HMS Uproar
- Builder: Vickers-Armstrongs, Barrow-in-Furness
- Laid down: 30 April 1940
- Launched: 27 November 1940
- Commissioned: 2 April 1941
- Renamed: Originally named P 31; Renamed Ullswater in February 1943; Renamed Uproar in April 1943.
- Fate: Sold to be broken up for scrap 13 February 1946
- Badge

General characteristics
- Class & type: U-class submarine
- Displacement: Surfaced - 540 tons standard, 630 tons full load; Submerged - 730 tons
- Length: 58.22 m (191 ft)
- Beam: 4.90 m (16 ft 1 in)
- Draught: 4.62 m (15 ft 2 in)
- Propulsion: 2 shaft diesel-electric; 2 Paxman Ricardo diesel generators + electric motors; 615 / 825 hp
- Speed: 11.25 knots (20.8 km/h) max surfaced; 10 knots (19 km/h) max submerged
- Complement: 27-31
- Armament: 4 bow internal 21 inch (533 mm) torpedo tubes - 8 - 10 torpedoes; 1 - 3-inch (76 mm) gun

HMS Uproar (P31) was a Royal Navy U-class submarine built by Vickers-Armstrongs at Barrow-in-Furness. So far she has been the only ship of the Royal Navy to bear the name Uproar. She was originally named P 31, renamed Ulleswater in February 1943 and finally renamed Uproar in April 1943.

== Career ==
One of her first actions, whilst serving as P 31, was to participate in the operation that led to the sinking of the Bismarck, though she did not see action directly.

Uproar spent most of the war operating in the Mediterranean as part of the 10th flotilla, using Malta as a base. She was damaged whilst in port by an air raid, and required repairs before continuing operations. On commencing patrols, she went on to sink the Italian auxiliary patrol vessel D-15/Brindisi, the Italian merchant Chietti (the former French Artesien), and the small Italian passenger ship Andrea Sgarallino. The Andrea Sgarallino had some 300 civilians on board off which only four survived. She also sank the Italian merchant Marin Sanudo. Uproar was subsequently attacked by depth charges from the Italian torpedo boats Cigno and Procione.

Other targets included the German (former French) tanker Champagne, which ran aground off Bastia, Corsica, France after being torpedoed on the 24th by HMS Ultor. Uproar also damaged the German tanker Matera (the former French General Gassouin) and the German troop transport Virgilio (the former Yugoslavian Dubrovnik) north-east of St. Tropez, southern France. The Viriglio was towed to Toulon but declared a total loss.

Uproar also unsuccessfully attacked the Italian merchant Chisone, the German submarine U-466 and the Italian light cruiser Raimondo Montecuccoli. She also participated in operations Harpoon and Vigorous in June 1942.

Uproar survived the war and was sold for scrap on 13 February 1946, and scrapped at Thos. W. Ward Inverkeithing.
