= German submarine U-970 =

German World War II submarine

- U-570 Type VIIC submarine that was captured by the British in 1941. This U-boat is almost identical to U-970.

History

Nazi Germany
- Name: U-970
- Ordered: 5 June 1941
- Builder: Blohm & Voss, Hamburg
- Yard number: 170
- Laid down: 29 May 1942
- Launched: 11 February 1943
- Commissioned: 25 March 1943
- Fate: Sunk on 8 June 1944

General characteristics
- Class & type: Type VIIC submarine
- Displacement: 769 tonnes (757 long tons) surfaced; 871 t (857 long tons) submerged
- Length: 67.10 m (220 ft 2 in) o/a; 50.50 m (165 ft 8 in) pressure hull
- Beam: 6.20 m (20 ft 4 in) o/a; 4.70 m (15 ft 5 in) pressure hull
- Height: 9.60 m (31 ft 6 in)
- Draught: 4.74 m (15 ft 7 in)
- Installed power: 2,800–3,200 PS (2,100–2,400 kW; 2,800–3,200 bhp) (diesels); 750 PS (550 kW; 740 shp) (electric)
- Propulsion: 2 shafts; 2 × diesel engines; 2 × electric motors
- Speed: 17.7 knots (32.8 km/h; 20.4 mph) surfaced; 7.6 knots (14.1 km/h; 8.7 mph) submerged
- Range: 8,500 nmi (15,700 km; 9,800 mi) at 10 knots (19 km/h; 12 mph) surfaced; 80 nmi (150 km; 92 mi) at 4 knots (7.4 km/h; 4.6 mph) submerged
- Test depth: 220 m (720 ft); Crush depth: 250–295 m (820–968 ft)
- Complement: 4 officers, 44–52 enlisted
- Armament: 5 × 53.3 cm (21 in) torpedo tubes (four bow, one stern); 14 × torpedoes or; 26 TMA mines; 1 × 8.8 cm (3.46 in) deck gun (220 rounds); 1 × twin 2 cm (0.79 in) C/30 anti-aircraft gun

Service record
- Part of: 5th U-boat Flotilla; 25 March 1943 – 29 February 1944; 3rd U-boat Flotilla; 1 March – 8 June 1944
- Identification codes: M 51 558
- Commanders: Oblt.z.S. / Kptlt. Hans-Heinrich Ketels; 25 March 1943 – 8 June 1944
- Operations: 2 patrols: 1st patrol: 16 March – 22 April 1944; 2nd patrol: 6 – 8 June 1944
- Victories: None

German submarine U-970 was a Type VIIC U-boat of Nazi Germany's Kriegsmarine during World War II.

She was ordered on 5 June 1941, and was laid down on 29 May 1942 at Blohm & Voss, Hamburg, as yard number 170. She was launched on 11 February 1943 and commissioned under the command of Oberleutnant zur See Hans-Heinrich Ketels on 25 March 1943.

== Design ==
German Type VIIC submarines were preceded by the shorter Type VIIB submarines. U-970 had a displacement of 769 tonnes (757 long tons) when at the surface and 871 tonnes (857 long tons) while submerged. She had a total length of 67.10 m (220 ft 2 in), a pressure hull length of 50.50 m (165 ft 8 in), a beam of 6.20 m (20 ft 4 in), a height of 9.60 m (31 ft 6 in), and a draught of 4.74 m (15 ft 7 in). The submarine was powered by two Germaniawerft F46 four-stroke, six-cylinder supercharged diesel engines producing a total of 2,800 to 3,200 metric horsepower (2,060 to 2,350 kW; 2,760 to 3,160 shp) for use while surfaced, two Garbe, Lahmeyer & Co. RP 137/c double-acting electric motors producing a total of 750 metric horsepower (550 kW; 740 shp) for use while submerged. She had two shafts and two 1.23 m (4 ft) propellers. The boat was capable of operating at depths of up to 230 metres (750 ft).

The submarine had a maximum surface speed of 17.7 knots (32.8 km/h; 20.4 mph) and a maximum submerged speed of 7.6 knots (14.1 km/h; 8.7 mph). When submerged, the boat could operate for 80 nautical miles (150 km; 92 mi) at 4 knots (7.4 km/h; 4.6 mph); when surfaced, she could travel 8,500 nautical miles (15,700 km; 9,800 mi) at 10 knots (19 km/h; 12 mph). U-970 was fitted with five 53.3 cm (21 in) torpedo tubes (four fitted at the bow and one at the stern), fourteen torpedoes or 26 TMA mines, one 8.8 cm (3.46 in) SK C/35 naval gun, 220 rounds, and one twin 2 cm (0.79 in) C/30 anti-aircraft gun. The boat had a complement of between 44 and 52 men.

== Service history ==
On 8 June 1944, U-970 was sunk by depth charges west of Bordeaux, France, in the Bay of Biscay at 0135 hrs. U-970 was attacked by a British Sunderland of 228 Squadron/R RAF. Fourteen of the crew of fifty-two survived.

The wreck is located at 45°15′N 04°10′W.

== Bibliography ==
- Busch, Rainer; Röll, Hans-Joachim (1999). German U-boat commanders of World War II : a biographical dictionary. Translated by Brooks, Geoffrey. London, Annapolis, Md: Greenhill Books, Naval Institute Press. ISBN 1-55750-186-6.
- Busch, Rainer; Röll, Hans-Joachim (1999). Der U-Boot-Krieg, 1939-1945: Deutsche U-Boot-Verluste von September 1939 bis Mai 1945 [German U-boat losses from September 1939 to May 1945] (in German). Vol. IV. Hamburg, Berlin, Bonn: Mittler. ISBN 3-8132-0514-2.
- Gröner, Erich; Jung, Dieter; Maass, Martin (1991). U-boats and Mine Warfare Vessels. German Warships 1815–1945. Vol. 2. Translated by Thomas, Keith; Magowan, Rachel. London: Conway Maritime Press. ISBN 0-85177-593-4.
