= HMS Loch Arkaig =

Frigate of the Royal Navy

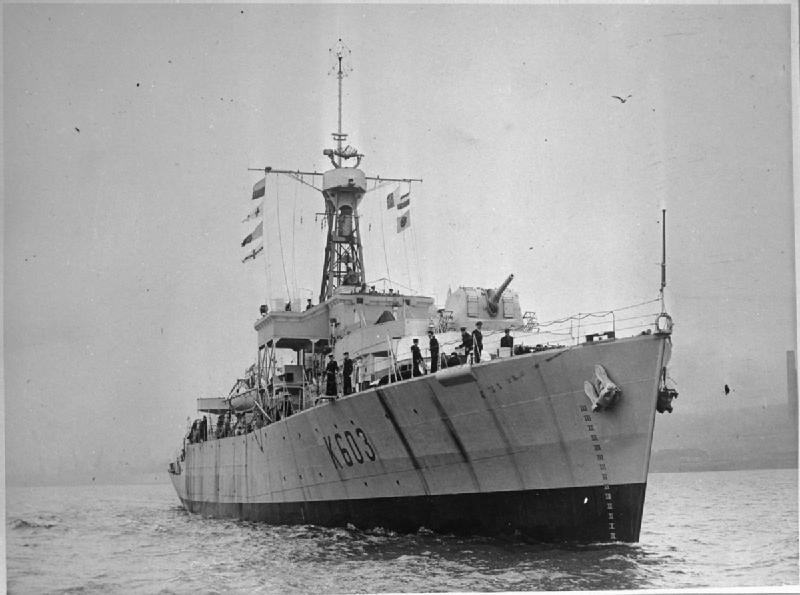
- Loch Arkaig on completion in 1945

History

United Kingdom
- Name: HMS Loch Arkaig
- Namesake: Loch Arkaig
- Ordered: 2 February 1943
- Builder: Caledon Shipbuilding, Dundee
- Yard number: 421
- Laid down: 1 November 1943
- Launched: 7 June 1944
- Completed: 17 November 1945
- Commissioned: 1 November 1945
- Decommissioned: 1952
- Identification: Pennant number K603
- Fate: Sold for scrapping, 1959

General characteristics
- Class & type: Loch-class frigate
- Displacement: 1,435 long tons (1,458 t)
- Length: 307 ft 9 in (93.80 m)
- Beam: 38 ft 9 in (11.81 m)
- Draught: 8 ft 9 in (2.67 m)
- Propulsion: 2 × Admiralty 3-drum boilers; 2 shafts; Parsons single reduction geared turbines, 6,500 shp (4,800 kW)
- Speed: 20 knots (37 km/h; 23 mph)
- Range: 9,500 nmi (17,600 km) at 12 kn (22 km/h; 14 mph)
- Complement: 114
- Armament: 1 × QF 4-inch (102 mm) Mark V gun on mounting HA Mk.III**; 4 × QF 2-pounder (40 mm) Mk.VII guns on quad mount Mk.VII; 4 × Oerlikon 20 mm cannon A/A on 2 twin mounts Mk.V (or 2 × 40 mm Bofors A/A on 2 single mounts Mk.III); Up to 8 × 20 mm Oerlikon A/A on single mounts Mk.III; 2 × Squid triple barrelled A/S mortars; 1 rail and 2 throwers for depth charges

HMS Loch Arkaig (K603) was a Loch-class frigate of the British Royal Navy, named after Loch Arkaig in Scotland. The ship was ordered from Caledon Shipbuilding & Engineering Company, Dundee, Scotland, on 2 February 1943, and laid down on 1 November 1943. Launched on 7 June 1944, the ship was commissioned on 1 November 1945, and completed on 17 November. Unlike the rest of the class Loch Arkaig (along with Loch Tralaig) was fitted with Parsons single reduction geared turbines, rather than 4-cylinder vertical triple expansion reciprocating engines. The ship served in the Home Fleet until laid-up and put into Reserve in 1952, and was sold for scrapping in 1959.

== Service history ==
After sea trials and commissioning in November 1945 Loch Arkaig sailed to the Clyde in December for modifications to stiffen her hull. In January 1946 the ship carried out Squid anti-submarine mortar and radio direction finding calibration, before joining the Flotilla at Derry to take part in "Operation Deadlight". She sank the U-boat U-975 on 10 February, and U-3514 on 12 February with her Squid mortar and Shark 4-inch projectiles. U-3514 was the last U-boat to be sunk in "Operation Deadlight".

For the next few years Loch Arkaig carried out training duties for anti-submarine personnel and Flotilla duties at Derry. In February 1949 Loch Arkaig, along with the aircraft carrier Vengeance, and destroyers St. Kitts and Gabbard, sailed into the Arctic, around Jan Mayen island, to study the effects of very cold weather on the performance of naval personnel and equipment ("Operation Rusty").

In mid-1950 she took part in Flag Officer Submarines summer war exercises and Home Fleet visits, calling at Haugesund and Nordheimsund in Norway. In December, after a refit at Chatham Dockyard she joined the 6th Frigate Flotilla, Home Fleet. In April 1951 she took part in the search for the missing submarine Affray, before the usual programme of exercises and visits.

=== Disposal ===
In 1952 Loch Arkaig was decommissioned, and laid-up in Reserve at Hartlepool. In 1957 she was placed on the Disposal List, and sold to the British Iron & Steel Corporation (BISCO) in 1959 for demolition by J.J. King at Gateshead, arriving in tow at the breaker's yard on 28 January 1960.

== Publications ==
- Boniface, Patrick (2013). Loch Class Frigates. Maritime Books. ISBN 978-1-904459-54-5.
- Colledge, J. J.; Warlow, Ben (2006) [1969]. Ships of the Royal Navy: The Complete Record of All Fighting Ships of the Royal Navy from the 15th Century to the Present (3rd Rev ed.). London: Chatham Publishing. ISBN 978-1-86176-281-8. OCLC 67375475.
- Service Histories of Royal Navy Warships in World War II : HMS Loch Arkaig
