= Marviken, Södermanland =

Three lakes in Södermanland, Sweden

Marviken
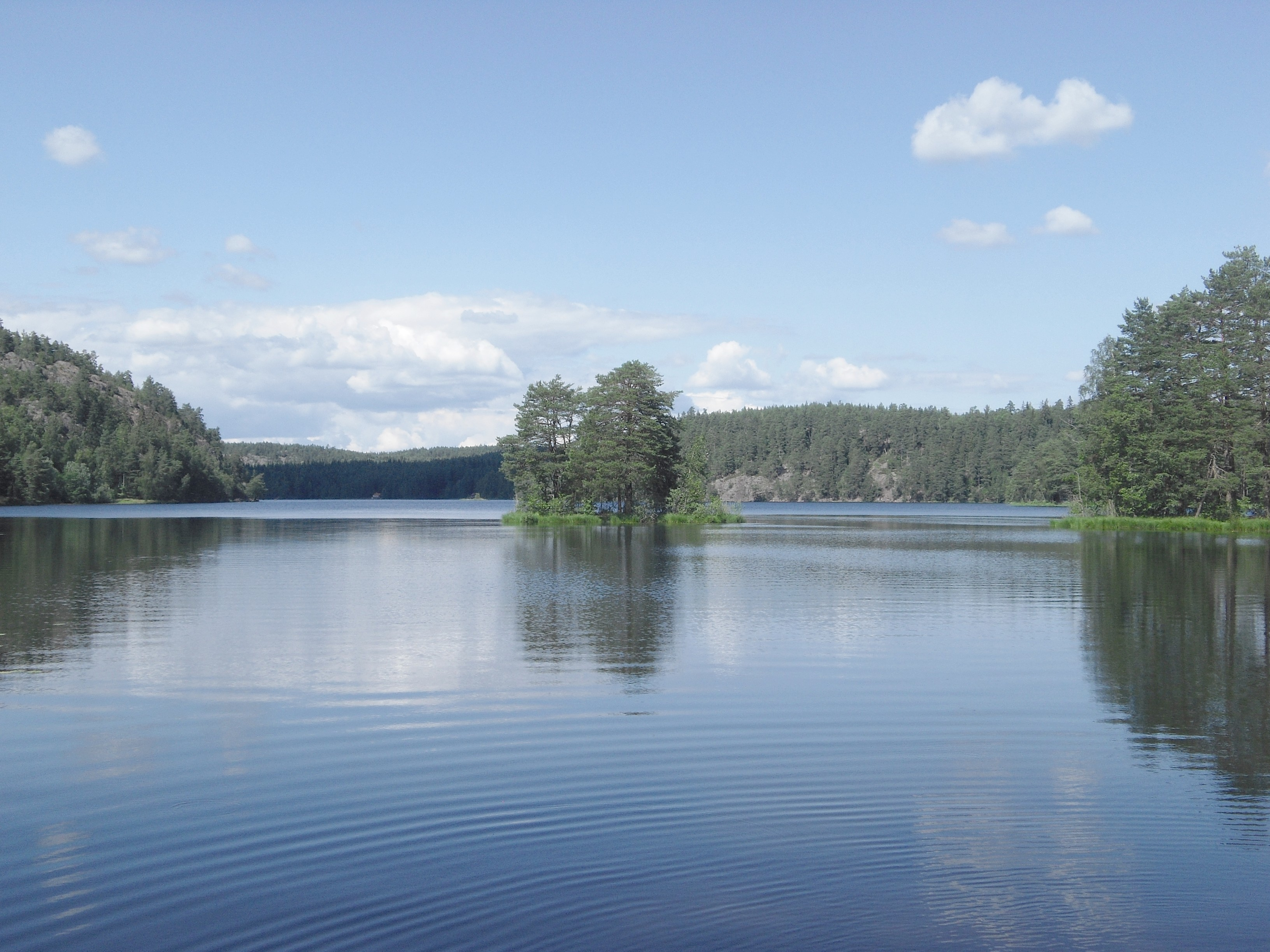

- Location within Södermanland
- Coordinates: 59°12′00″N 17°09′40″E
- Basin countries: Sweden

Marviken is three lakes that are: Övre Marviken, Mellan-Marviken, and Nedre Marviken in Södermanland, Sweden.
