= List of wolfpacks of World War II =

Wolfpacks (German: U-Boot-Gruppe) were employed by Nazi Germany's Kriegsmarine during World War II against Allied and neutral shipping. They were also used later in the Pacific War by the United States against Japanese shipping.

== Outbreak of War ==
From the outbreak of war until mid-1940 there were various groups of U-boats engaged in collective patrols. With the exception of the experimental, Hartmann's wolfpack, in 1939, the first recognised wolfpack was led by Korvettenkapitän Günther Prien in June 1940.

=== Invasion of Norway and Denmark ===
In preparation for the invasion of Norway and Denmark, in early April 1940, 31 U-boats were readied for operations between England and Norway. On 6 April, the codeword Hartmut was transmitted and German submarines began their operations.

== List of Wolfpacks ==
Wolfpacks
Name	From	To	Boats	Ships Sunk	Damaged	Boats Lost	Notes
Hartmann	Oct 1939	Apr 1940	6	7	0	3	Atlantic vs. convoys KJF 3 and HG 3. U-37, U-40 † U-42 † U-45 †, U-46 and U-48. The name Hartmann was informal.
Prien	12 Jun 1940	17 Jun 1940	7	5	0	0	Atlantic vs. convoys HX.47 and HX.48. Comprised U-25, U-28, U-30, U-32, U-38, U-47 and U-51. Sank the British tanker San Fernando (U-47), the Norwegian tanker Eli Knudsen (U-32) and the Norwegian Randsfjord (U-30).
Rösing	12 Jun 1940	15 Jun 1940	5	4	0	0	Atlantic off northwest Spain vs. convoys SL.34 and US.3. Comprised U-29, U-43, U-46, U-48 and U-101.
West	8 May 1941	20 Jun 1941	23	33	4	1	Two-part operation in the Atlantic vs. convoys HX.126, HX.128, OB.317, OB.318, OB.322, OB.327, OB.328, OB.329, OB.330 and SC.30. Comprised, at times, U-43, U-46, U-48, U-66, U-73, U-74, U-75, U-77, U-93, U-94, U-97, U-98, U-101, U-108, U-109, U-110 †, U-111, U-201, U-204, U-553, U-556, U-557 and U-751.
Kurfürst	16 Jun 1941	20 Jun 1941	5	1	0	0	Atlantic vs. convoy SL.76. Comprised U-43, U-73, U-201, U-204 and U-371.
Süd	22 Jul 1941	5 Aug 1941	4	0	0	0	Atlantic, off the northwest coast of Africa. Comprised U-93, U-94, U-109 and U-124.
Hammer	5 Aug 1941	12 Aug 1941	3	0	0	0	Atlantic, off the southwestern approaches to the UK. Comprised U-96, U-105 and U-751.
Grönland	10 Aug 1941	27 Aug 1941	21	3	1	0	Atlantic vs. convoy ON.4. Comprised U-38, U-43, U-71, U-73, U-77, U-82, U-84, U-96, U-101, U-105, U-129, U-202, U-206, U-501, U-553, U-563, U-567, U-568, U-569, U-652 and U-751. Sank HMS Picotee (U-568) and damaged the British auxiliary minelayer HMS Southern Prince (U-652).
Kurfürst II	23 Aug 1941	2 Sep 1941	7	0	0	0	Atlantic vs. convoy OG.73. Comprised U-77, U-96, U-206, U-553, U-563, U-567 and U-568.
Markgraf	27 Aug 1941	16 Sep 1941	15	17	4	2	Atlantic vs. convoys ON.10, ON.11 and SC.42. Comprised U-38, U-43, U-81, U-82, U-84, U-85, U-105, U-202, U-207 †, U-432, U-433, U-501 †, U-569 and U-652.
Bosemüller	28 Aug 1941	2 Sep 1941	8	1	0	0	Atlantic vs. convoys SL.84 and OG.73. Comprised U-71, U-83, U-95, U-557, U-558, U-561, U-562 and U-751.
Seewolf	2 Sep 1941	15 Sep 1941	17	5	0	0	Atlantic vs. convoy ON.14 and/or convoy OG.73. Comprised U-69, U-71, U-77, U-83, U-94, U-95, U-96, U-98, U-206, U-553, U-557, U-558, U-561, U-563, U-567, U-568 and U-751.
Brandenburg	15 Sep 1941	2 Oct 1941	11	11	0	0	Atlantic vs. convoys ON.14, SC.42, SC.44 and ON.16. Comprised U-69, U-74, U-94, U-372, U-373, U-431, U-552, U-562, U-564, U-572, U-575. Sank the corvette HMCS Lévis (U-74) and 10 merchant ships.
Goeben	16 Sep 1941	5 Oct 1941	6	0	0	0	Mediterranean Sea via the Strait of Gibraltar. Comprised U-75, U-79, U-97, U-331, U-371 and U-559.
Breslau	2 Oct 1941	29 Oct 1941	6	9	1	1	Atlantic vs. convoys OG.75 and HG 75. Comprised U-71, U-83, U-204, U-206, U-563, and U-564. Sank destroyer HMS Cossack (U-563) and corvette HMS Fleur de Lys (U-206); damaged the merchant ship Ariguani.
Mordbrenner	16 Oct 1941	3 Nov 1941	4	2	0	0	Off Newfoundland vs. convoys including ON.27 and SC.52. Comprised U-105, U-208, U-374 and U-573.
Schlagetot	20 Oct 1941	1 Nov 1941	9	2	1	0	Atlantic vs. convoy SL.89. Comprised U-38, U-82, U-84, U-85, U-93, U-123, U-202, U-203 and U-569. Damaged the armed merchant cruiser RMS Aurania (U-123).
Reissewolf	21 Oct 1941	31 Oct 1941	7	1	0	0	North Atlantic vs. convoy HG 75. Comprised U-73, U-77, U-101, U-432, U-502, U-568 and U-751.
Stosstrupp	30 Oct 1941	4 Nov 1941	6	2	0	0	Atlantic vs. convoys OS.10 and HX.156. Comprised U-96, U-133, U-552, U-567, U-571 and U-577. Sank the US destroyer USS Reuben James (U-552).
Raubritter	1 Nov 1941	17 Nov 1941	14	4	0	0	Atlantic off Newfoundland vs. convoy SC.52. Comprised U-38, U-74, U-82, U-84, U-85, U-93, U-106, U-123, U-133, U-202, U-203, U-569, U-571 and U-577.
Arnauld	5 Nov 1941	18 Nov 1941	4	1	0	1	U-boats from the Atlantic to Mediterranean via Strait of Gibraltar; U-81, U-205, U-433 † and U-565. Sank HMS Ark Royal (U-81).
Störtebecker	5 Nov 1941	2 Dec 1941	19	0	0	0	Atlantic vs. OS.11. Comprised U-69, U-77, U-85, U-96, U-98, U-103, U-107, U-123, U-133, U-201, U-332, U-372, U-373, U-402, U-552, U-567, U-571, U-572 and U-577.
Steuben	14 Nov 1941	2 Dec 1941	6	3	0	0	Atlantic, off Cape Race, Newfoundland, vs. Allied convoys including OS.12. Comprised U-43, U-105, U-372, U-434, U-574 and U-575.
Benecke	19 Nov 1941	2 Dec 1941	4	0	0	0	Atlantic vs. OG convoys. Comprised U-96, U-332, U-402 and U-552.
Gödecke	19 Nov 1941	26 Nov 1941	4	0	0	0	Atlantic, with Benecke and Störtebecker packs, vs. OG.77. Comprised U-69, U-98, U-201 and U-572.
Letzte Ritter	25 Nov 1941	4 Dec 1941	3	0	0	0	Atlantic. Comprised U-69, U-201 and U-402.
Seeräuber	14 Dec 1941	23 Dec 1941	8	3	0	4	Atlantic vs. convoy HG 76. Comprised U-67, U-71, U-107, U-108, U-125, U-127, U-131, U-434, U-567 and U-574.
Ulan	25 Dec 1941	19 Jan 1942	3	4	1	0	Norwegian Sea vs. convoys PQ.7A, PQ.7B and PQ.8. Comprised U-134, U-454 and U-584. Sank destroyer HMS Matabele (U-454) and Soviet submarine M-175.
Seydlitz	27 Dec 1941	16 Jan 1942	7	0	0	1	Atlantic vs. HG 78. Comprised U-71, U-84, U-93 †, U-203, U-373, U-552 and U-571.
Zieten	6 Jan 1942	22 Jan 1942	12	11	3	0	Atlantic, off Newfoundland, vs. convoys SC.62, ON.52, SC.63 and ON.53. Comprised U-84, U-86, U-87, U-135, U-203, U-333, U-552, U-553, U-582, U-654, U-701 and U-754.
Siegfried	11 Jan 1942	16 Jan 1942	3	0	0	0	Central North Atlantic vs. convoys ON 207 and HX 262. Comprised U-71, U-93 and U-571.
Robbe	15 Jan 1942	24 Jan 1942	4	1	0	0	UK−Iceland gap vs. convoy SC.63. Comprised U-94, U-582, U-587 and U-588. Sank the Greek Dimitrios G. Themiotis and British Caledonian Monarch.
Schlei	16 Jan 1942	12 Feb 1942	7	3	0	0	Norwegian Sea and UK−Iceland gap vs. convoys ON.63 and SC.67. Comprised U-136, U-212, U-404, U-578, U-591, U-656 and U-753. Corvettes HMS Arbutus (U-136) and HMCS Spikenard (U-136) sunk, with Norwegian transport Heina.
Hecht	27 Jan 1942	4 Feb 1942	3	0	0	0	UK−Iceland gap. U-352, U-435 and U-455.
Umbau	4 Feb 1942	16 Feb 1942	4	0	0	0	Norwegian Sea, U-134, U-435, U-436 and U-456.
Neuland	16 Feb 1942	18 Mar 1942	?	?	?	?	Caribbean Sea, used single boats against Allied shipping, especially oil tankers and aluminium ore transports.
Westwall	2 Mar 1942	12 Mar 1942	8	5	0	0	Atlantic, west of the British Isles. Comprised U-87, U-135, U-212, U-213, U-553, U-569, U-701, U-752 and U-753.
(No Name)	7 Mar 1942	11 Mar 1942	4	0	0	0	
Umhang	10 Mar 1942	16 Mar 1942	3	0	0	0	North Norway U-436, U-454 and U-456.
Blücher	11 Mar 1942	18 Mar 1942	3	0	0	0	West coast of Norway. Comprised U-377, U-403 and U-589.
Wrangel	11 Mar 1942	18 Mar 1942	2	0	0	0	Off Norway. Comprised only U-405 and U-592.
York	12 Mar 1942	26 Mar 1942	4	0	0	0	Norwegian Sea. Comprised U-135, U-553, U-569 and U-701.
Zieten II	23 Mar 1942	29 Mar 1942	4	0	0	1	Off North Norway U-209, U-376, U-378 and U-655 †.
Eiswolf	28 Mar 1942	31 Mar 1942	8	2	1	1	Arctic Ocean vs.. convoy PQ 13 U-209, U-376, U-378, U-435, U-454, U-456, U-585 † and U-589.
Naseweis	31 Mar 1942	10 Apr 1942	3	0	0	0	Arctic Ocean, Iceland, Greenland and Svalbard archipelago U-334, U-592 and U-667.
Bums	6 Apr 1942	14 Apr 1942	6	0	0	0	Northwest Norway U-334, U-377, U-403, U-589, U-591 and U-592.
Robbenschlag	7 Apr 1942	14 Apr 1942	8	3	0	0	North Norway vs.. convoys QP 10 and PQ 14 U-209, U-376, U-378, U-435, U-436, U-454, U-456 and U-589.
Blutrausch	15 Apr 1942	19 Apr 1942	10	1	0	0	Norway vs.. convoy PQ.14. Comprised U-209, U-376, U-377, U-378, U-403, U-436, U-454, U-456, U-589 and U-592.
Strauchritter	29 Apr 1942	5 May 1942	9	1	2	0	Off the north coast of Norway vs.. convoys QP.11 and PQ.15. Comprised U-88, U-251, U-376, U-378, U-405, U-436, U-456, U-589 and U-703.
Hecht II	8 May 1942	18 Jun 1942	9	14	1	0	Atlantic vs. convoys ON 92, ONS 100, ONS 102 and two more ON U-94, U-96, U-116, U-124, U-404, U-406, U-569, U-578 and U-590.
Greif	14 May 1942	29 May 1942	6	1	0	0	North Norway vs. convoys PQ 16 and QP 12 U-209, U-436, U-582, U-589, U-591 and U-703.
Pfadfinder	21 May 1942	27 May 1942	8	2	0	0	Canadian east coast U-135, U-212, U-404, U-432, U-455, U-553, U-566, U-578 and U-653.
Endraß	12 Jun 1942	17 Jun 1942	9	5	0	0	Atlantic vs. convoy HG 84. Comprised U-71, U-84, U-89, U-132, U-134, U-437, U-552, U-571 and U-575.
Eisteufel	21 Jun 1942	12 Jul 1942	11	13	0	0	Norwegian Sea, Arctic Ocean with Operation Rösselsprung vs. convoy PQ 17 U-88, U-251, U-255, U-334, U-355, U-376, U-408, U-456, U-457 and U-657.
Hai	3 Jul 1942	21 Jul 1942	6	9	1	1	Atlantic vs. Convoy OS 33, U-116, U-136 †, U-201, U-572, U-582 and U-752.
Wolf	13 Jul 1942	1 Aug 1942	11	2	2	1	Atlantic, vs. convoys Convoy ON 111 and Convoy ON 113 U-43, U-71, U-86, U-90 †, U-379, U-454, U-461, U-552, U-597, U-607 and U-704.
Nebelkönig	27 Jul 1942	14 Aug 1942	10	0	0	0	Greenland Sea, Norwegian Sea U-255, U-355, U-403, U-405, U-435, U-582, U-589, U-591, U-592 and U-657.
Pirat	29 Jul 1942	3 Aug 1942	13	1	2	1	Atlantic vs. convoy Convoy ON 115 U-43, U-71, U-164, U-210, U-217, U-454, U-511, U-552, U-553, U-588 †, U-597, U-607 and U-704.
Steinbrock	29 Jul 1942	3 Aug 1942	11	2	2	1	Atlantic, with Pirat, vs. convoy Convoy ON 115 U-43, U-71, U-164, U-210 †, U-217, U-511, U-552, U-553, U-597, U-607 and U-704.
Steinbrinck	3 Aug 1942	11 Aug 1942	14	11	3	2	Atlantic vs. convoy Convoy SC 94 U-71, U-176, U-210 †, U-256, U-379 †, U-454, U-552, U-593, U-595, U-597, U-605, U-607, U-660 and U-704.
Lohs	11 Aug 1942	22 Sep 1942	19	8	0	1	Atlantic vs. Convoy SC 95, Convoy ONS 122, Convoy SC 100 U-135, U-174, U-176, U-216, U-256, U-259, U-373, U-410, U-432, U-438, U-462, U-569, U-593, U-596, U-599, U-605, U-660, U-705 † and U-755.
Blücher	14 Aug 1942	28 Aug 1942	8	6	1	0	Atlantic vs. Convoy SL 118, Convoy SL 119 U-107, U-214, U-333, U-406, U-566, U-590, U-594 and U-653.
Eisbär	17 Oct 1942	13 Nov 1942	5	1	0	0	Atlantic off Iberia and North-west Africa vs. Convoy SL 119 U-68, U-156, U-172, U-459 and U-504.
Vorwärts	25 Aug 1942	26 Sep 1942	18	15	9	1	Atlantic, with Stier, vs. Convoy SC 97, Convoy ON 127 and Convoy RB 1 U-91, U-92, U-211, U-218, U-380, U-404, U-407, U-409, U-411, U-461, U-584, U-594, U-604, U-608, U-609, U-659 and U-756 †.
Stier	29 Aug 1942	2 Sep 1942	6	0	0	0	Atlantic, with Vorwärts, vs. Convoy ON 127 U-96, U-380, U-404, U-584, U-594 and U-608.
Iltis	25 Aug 1942	29 Aug 1942	4	2	0	0	Off north-west Africa vs. Convoy SL 119 U-107, U-214, U-406 and U-566.
Pfeil	12 Sep 1942	22 Sep 1942	11	0	0	0	Atlantic vs. Convoy SC 99, Convoy ON 129 U-216, U-221, U-258, U-356, U-440, U-595, U-607, U-615, U-617, U-618 and U-661.
Trägertod	12 Sep 1942	22 Sep 1942	10	4	1	3	Arctic Ocean vs. Convoy PQ 18, Convoy QP 14 U-88 †, U-377, U-378, U-403, U-405, U-408, U-457 †, U-589 †, U-592 and U-703. Sank destroyer HMS Somali (U-703).
Blitz	22 Sep 1942	26 Sep 1942	19	7	0	0	Atlantic vs. Convoy SC 100, Convoy ON 131 and Convoy RB 1. U-216, U-221, U-258, U-259, U-260, U-356, U-310, U-437, U-582, U-595, U-597, U-599, U-607, U-615, U-617, U-618, U-619, U-661 and U-755.
Tiger	26 Sep 1942	30 Sep 1942	17	0	0	0	Atlantic vs. Convoy ON 131 U-221, U-258, U-260, U-356, U-407, U-410, U-437, U-575, U-582, U-595, U-597, U-599, U-607, U-615, U-617, U-618 and U-755.
Luchs	27 Sep 1942	6 Oct 1942	19	2	0	2	Atlantic vs. Convoy SC 101 and Convoy HX 209 U-183, U-216, U-254, U-257, U-260, U-382, U-404, U-437, U-442, U-575, U-582 †, U-597, U-610, U-619 †, U-620, U-706, U-753 and U-755.
Letze Ritter II	29 Sep 1942	1 Oct 1942	4	0	0	0	Atlantic vs. convoys associated with Operation Torch. Comprised U-216, U-404, U-410 and U-584.
Tümmler	1 Oct 1942	11 Oct 1942	6	0	0	0	Bay of Biscay, eastern part of the central Atlantic and western part of the Mediterranean. Comprised U-89, U-438, U-458, U-593, U-605 and U-660.
Wotan	5 Oct 1942	19 Oct 1942	11	21	0	1	Atlantic, in tandem with Leopard, vs. convoys ON.135, ON.136, SC.104, and ON.137. Comprised U-118, U-216, U-221, U-258, U-356, U-410, U-599, U-607, U-615, U-618 and U-661 †.
Panther	6 Oct 1942	20 Oct 1942	34	3	0	1	Atlantic vs. convoys SC.103, ONS.136 and ONS.137. Comprised U-71, U-84, U-89, U-132, U-183, U-254, U-260, U-301, U-353, U-381, U-382, U-402, U-437, U-438, U-441, U-442, U-443, U-454, U-518, U-563, U-571, U-575, U-597 †, U-602, U-609, U-610, U-620, U-621, U-658, U-662, U-704, U-706, U-753 and U-757.
Leopard	12 Oct 1942	19 Oct 1942	8	1	0	2	Atlantic, in tandem with Wotan, vs. convoys ONS.136 and SC.104. Comprised U-254, U-353 †, U-382, U-437, U-442, U-597 †, U-620 and U-662.
Puma	16 Oct 1942	29 Oct 1942	13	13	3	0	Atlantic vs. convoys ON.138, ON.139 and HX.212. Comprised U-224, U-301, U-383, U-436, U-441, U-443, U-563, U-575, U-602, U-606, U-621, U-624 and U-753.
Streitaxt	20 Oct 1942	2 Nov 1942	10	12	7	0	Atlantic, off the Strait of Gibraltar, vs. convoy SL.125. Comprised U-103, U-134, U-203, U-409, U-440, U-509, U-510, U-572, U-604 and U-659.
Veilchen	20 Oct 1942	7 Nov 1942	13	8	2	1	Atlantic vs. convoy SC.107. Initially comprised U-71, U-84, U-89, U-132, U-381, U-402, U-438, U-454, U-571, U-658 † and U-704, reinforced by U-437 and U-442.
Südwärts	24 Oct 1942	26 Oct 1942	6	0	0	0	Atlantic. Comprised U-154, U-260, U-301, U-620, U-662 and U-706.
Natter	30 Oct 1942	8 Nov 1942	15	2	0	0	Atlantic vs. convoy ON.142. Comprised U-86, U-91, U-92, U-98, U-218, U-224, U-383, U-436, U-564, U-566, U-606, U-613, U-624, U-653 and U-753.
Delphin	4 Nov 1942	14 Nov 1942	9	1	0	1	Western Mediterranean and eastern Atlantic off the Strait of Gibraltar. Comprised U-259, U-380, U-407, U-440, U-595 †, U-596, U-617, U-662 and U-755. Sank the Dutch Nieuw Zeeland of the Operation Torch invasion convoys.
Kreuzotter	8 Nov 1942	24 Nov 1942	13	7	1	1	Atlantic vs. convoy ON.144. Comprised U-84, U-184 †, U-224, U-262, U-383, U-454, U-521, U-522, U-606, U-611, U-624 and U-753.
Westwall II	8 Nov 1942	16 Dec 1942	20	11	3	1	Atlantic, in the Bay of Biscay and western Mediterranean, vs. convoys for Operation Torch, MKF.1X, MKF.1Y, MKS.1X, KMS.3, ON.149. Comprised U-86, U-91, U-92, U-98 †, U-103, U-106, U-118, U-130, U-155, U-185, U-218, U-263, U-411, U-413, U-515, U-519, U-564, U-566, U-613 and U-653.
Schlagetot II	9 Nov 1942	21 Nov 1942	10	4	3	2	Off the northwest coast of Africa vs. convoy UGF.1. A reaction to Operation Torch. Comprised U-103, U-108, U-130, U-173, U-509, U-510, U-511, U-572 and U-752.
Wal	10 Nov 1942	15 Nov 1942	8	3	1	2	Mediterranean Sea vs. convoys for Operation Torch. Comprised U-73, U-81 †, U-259, U-380, U-407, U-565, U-617 and U-660 †.
Boreas	19 Nov 1942	9 Dec 1942	10	2	0	0	Between Norway and the Svalbard islands group vs. convoy QP.15. Comprised U-209, U-212, U-376, U-378, U-405, U-456, U-582, U-592, U-601 and U-625. Sank the British Goolistan (U-625) and the Soviet Kuznets (U-601).
Drachen	22 Nov 1942	3 Dec 1942	5	2	0	0	Atlantic vs. convoys SC.110 and HX.216. Comprised U-262, U-445, U-611, U-623 and U-663. Sank the British Ocean Crusader (HX.216) by U-262 and Barberrys (SC.110) convoy by U-663.
Panzer	23 Nov 1942	11 Dec 1942	11	1	0	2	Atlantic vs. HX.217. Comprised U-135, U-211, U-254 †, U-439, U-445, U-465, U-524 †, U-611, U-623, U-663 and U-758. Sank the British Empire Spenser (U-524).
Panther	29 Nov 1942	11 Dec 1942	7	?	?	?	Atlantic vs. convoys ONS.148 and HX.217. Comprised U-135, U-211, U-254, U-439, U-465, U-524 and U-758.
Draufgänger	29 Nov 1942	11 Dec 1942	10	3	0	0	Atlantic vs. convoys MKF.3 and HX.217. Comprised U-221, U-373, U-455, U-553, U-569, U-600, U-604, U-609, U-610 and U-615.
Büffel	9 Dec 1942	15 Dec 1942	3	0	0	0	Atlantic vs. Convoy HX 218:HX.218. Comprised U-373, U-445 and U-663.
Raufbold	11 Dec 1942	22 Dec 1942	14	4	1	0	Atlantic vs. convoys ON.152 and ON.153. Comprised U-135, U-203, U-211, U-356, U-409, U-410, U-439, U-600, U-609, U-610, U-621, U-623 and U-644.
Ungestüm	11 Dec 1942	30 Dec 1942	13	9	1	0	Atlantic vs. convoys HX.218, ONS.152 and, in tandem with Spitz, ON.154. Comprised U-336, U-373, U-435, U-445, U-455, U-524, U-569, U-591, U-604, U-615 and U-628.
Spitz	22 Dec 1942	31 Dec 1942	11	8	9	1	Atlantic, in tandem with Ungestüm, vs. convoy ONS.154. Comprised U-123, U-203, U-225, U-260, U-356 †, U-406, U-440, U-441, U-659, U-662 and U-664.
Delphin II	26 Dec 1942	14 Feb 1943	17	10	1	2	Atlantic vs. convoys TM.1 and UGS.4. Comprised U-87, U-107, U-125, U-202, U-258, U-264, U-381, U-436, U-442 †, U-463, U-511, U-514, U-522, U-558, U-571, U-575 and U-620 †.
Falke	28 Dec 1942	19 Jan 1943	23	6	0	0	Atlantic vs. convoys ONS.158, ONS.159, ONS.160 and HX.222. Comprised U-69, U-71, U-167, U-201, U-226, U-257, U-268, U-333, U-384, U-403, U-404, U-414, U-441, U-444, U-525, U-563, U-572, U-584, U-606, U-607, U-631, U-632 and U-706.
Habicht	10 Jan 1943	19 Jan 1943	10	1	0	0	Atlantic vs. convoys SC.115 and HX.222. Comprised U-186, U-226, U-268, U-303, U-383, U-438, U-613, U-624, U-704 and U-752.
Jaguar	10 Jan 1943	31 Jan 1943	8	2	0	0	Atlantic vs. convoys SC.117 and HX.223. Comprised U-96, U-123, U-266, U-413, U-594, U-598, U-662 and U-706.
Haugegen	19 Jan 1943	15 Feb 1943	26	2	1	1	Atlantic vs. convoys HX.223, SG.19, HX.225, SC.119 and ON.165.
Landsknecht	19 Jan 1943	28 Jan 1943	21	0	0	1	Atlantic vs. convoy HX.224. Comprised U-71, U-187, U-257, U-262, U-267, U-333, U-384, U-402, U-404, U-444, U-454, U-456, U-465, U-553 †, U-572, U-584, U-609, U-614, U-631 and U-632.
Nordwind	24 Jan 1943	4 Feb 1943	7	3	0	0	Off north coast of Norway vs. Convoy RA 52, U-255, U-302, U-622, U-625, U-629 and U-657.
Rochen	27 Jan 1943	1 Mar 1943	13	5	3	0	Atlantic, off northwest Africa, vs. convoys UC.1 and ON.165. Comprised U-43, U-66, U-87, U-108, U-118, U-202, U-218, U-258, U-264, U-461, U-504, U-521 and U-558.
Pfeil II	1 Feb 1943	9 Feb 1943	13	11	1	2	Atlantic vs. convoy SC.118. Comprised U-89, U-135, U-187 †, U-262, U-266, U-267, U-402, U-413, U-454, U-465, U-594, U-608 and U-609 †.
Nordsturm	2 Feb 1943	9 Feb 1943	5	1	0	0	Atlantic, south of Greenland, vs. convoy SG.19. Comprised U-186, U-223, U-268, U-358 and U-707.
Hartherz	3 Feb 1943	7 Feb 1943	10	0	0	0	Atlantic, west of the Bay of Biscay, vs. KMS and MKS convoys. Comprised U-71, U-107, U-183, U-332, U-519, U-572, U-584, U-621, U-628, U-653 and U-753.
Seehund	5 Feb 1943	12 Apr 1943	?	?	?	?	Off the coast of South Africa and in the Indian Ocean.
Ritter	11 Feb 1943	26 Feb 1943	13	5	4	1	Atlantic, in tandem with Knappen, vs. convoys HX.226 and ON.166. Comprised U-92, U-225, U-332, U-377, U-454, U-468, U-529, U-603, U-621, U-623 †, U-628, U-653 and U-753.
Taifun	15 Feb 1943	20 Feb 1943	5	1	0	0	Atlantic, off Newfoundland and Labrador, vs. convoy ONS.165. Comprised U-186, U-223, U-358 and U-707 detached from the Haudegen.
Robbe	16 Feb 1943	13 Mar 1943	8	6	2	0	Atlantic vs. convoys UC.1, KMS.10, OS.44 and others. Comprised U-103, U-107, U-382, U-410, U-437, U-445, U-511 and U-569.
Neptun	18 Feb 1943	3 Mar 1943	11	3	0	0	Atlantic vs. convoys HX.226 and HX.227. Comprised U-89, U-135, U-359, U-376, U-377, U-405, U-448, U-566, U-608, U-634, U-659, U-709 and U-759.
Knappen	19 Feb 1943	25 Feb 1943	4	2	2	0	Atlantic, in tandem with Ritter, vs. convoy ON.166. Comprised U-91, U-92, U-600 and U-604.
Sturmbock	21 Feb 1943	26 Feb 1943	9	2	0	0	Atlantic vs. convoy ONS.167. Comprised U-84, U-432, U-591, U-664 and U-758. Sank the Panamanian H. H. Rogers (U-664) and US Rosario (U-664).
Burggraf	24 Feb 1943	5 Mar 1943	18	1	0	0	Atlantic vs. convoy SC.121. Worked with the Neuland, Ostmark, Westmark and Wildfang wolfpacks.
Wildfang	26 Feb 1943	5 Mar 1943	10	0	0	0	Atlantic, in tandem with Ostmark and Westmark, against the SC.121. Comprised U-84, U-89, U-359, U-409, U-432, U-448, U-591, U-638, U-664 and U-758.
Tümmler II	1 Mar 1943	22 Mar 1943	6	2	0	0	Eastern Atlantic, off northwest Africa and the western approaches to the Strait of Gibraltar, with Unverzagt and Wohlgemut, vs. convoys UGS.6 and ON.165. Comprised U-43, U-66, U-202, U-504, U-521 and U-558.
Neuland	4 Mar 1943	13 Mar 1943	22	5	2	1	Atlantic vs. convoys HX.228 and SC.121. Comprised U-86, U-190, U-221, U-229, U-336, U-373, U-406, U-439, U-440, U-441, U-444 †, U-447, U-448, U-530, U-590, U-608, U-633, U-641, U-642, U-659, U-665 and U-757.
Ostmark	6 Mar 1943	11 Mar 1943	11	5	1	1	North Atlantic vs. convoy SC.121. Comprised U-190, U-229, U-439, U-447, U-530, U-618, U-633 †, U-641, U-642, U-665 and U-666.
Westmark	6 Mar 1943	11 Mar 1943	17	10	0	1	Atlantic, together with Burggraf, Neuland, Ostmark and Wildfang, vs. convoys SC.121 and HX.228. Comprised U-228, U-230, U-332, U-359, U-405, U-409, U-432 †, U-448, U-523, U-526, U-527, U-566, U-591, U-616, U-634, U-659 and U-709.
Raubgraf	7 Mar 1943	20 Mar 1943	13	11	3	0	Atlantic, in tandem with Dränger and Stürmer, vs. convoys ONS.169, ONS.170, SC.122 and HX.229. Comprised U-84, U-89, U-91, U-435, U-468, U-600, U-603, U-615, U-621, U-638, U-653, U-664 and U-758.
Stürmer	11 Mar 1943	20 Mar 1943	19	10	3	1	Atlantic, in tandem with Dränger and Raubgraf, vs. convoys SC.122 and HX.229. Comprised U-134, U-190, U-229, U-305, U-338, U-384 †, U-439, U-526, U-527, U-530, U-598, U-618, U-631, U-641, U-642, U-665 and U-666.
Unverzagt	12 Mar 1943	22 Mar 1943	6	2	1	1	Atlantic, off the western approaches to the Strait of Gibraltar, in tandem with Tümmler and Wohlgemut, vs. convoy UGS.6. Comprised U-106, U-130 †, U-167, U-172, U-513 and U-515.
Wohlgemut	12 Mar 1943	22 Mar 1943	5	1	0	1	Atlantic, in tandem with Tümmler and Unverzagt, vs. convoy UGS.6. Comprised U-67, U-103, U-109, U-159 and U-524 †.
Dränger	14 Mar 1943	20 Mar 1943	11	3	0	0	Atlantic vs. convoys HX.229 and SC.122, in conjunction with Raubgraf and Stürmer. Comprised U-86, U-221, U-333, U-336, U-373, U-406, U-440, U-441, U-590, U-608 and U-610.
Seeteufel	21 Mar 1943	30 Mar 1943	17	1	0	0	Convoy HX 230
Seewolf II	21 Mar 1943	30 Mar 1943	19	0	0	0	Atlantic vs. convoys SC.123 and HX.230. Comprised U-84, U-86, U-257, U-305, U-333, U-336, U-373, U-440, U-441, U-527, U-530, U-590, U-591, U-615, U-618, U-631, U-641, U-642 and U-666.
Seeräuber	25 Mar 1943	30 Mar 1943	7	3	0	0	Atlantic vs. convoy RS-3. Comprised U-67, U-123, U-159, U-167, U-172, U-513 and U-515.
Eisbär	27 Mar 1943	15 Apr 1943	12	0	0	1	Northwest coast of Norway vs. Allied Arctic convoys. Comprised U-212, U-251, U-255, U-269, U-302, U-354, U-355, U-378, U-467, U-625, U-639 and U-644 †.
(No name)	27 Mar 1943	30 Mar 1943	5	4	1	0	Convoy SL 126
Löwenherz	1 Apr 1943	10 Apr 1943	14	4	3	2	Atlantic vs. convoy HX.231. Comprised U-168, U-191, U-260, U-270, U-563, U-564, U-572, U-584, U-592, U-594, U-630, U-632 †, U-635 † and U-706.
Taifun II	2 Apr 1943	4 Apr 1943	4	0	0	0	Norwegian Sea. Comprised U-255, U-582, U-629 and U-646.
Adler	7 Apr 1943	13 Apr 1943	16	4	0	0	Atlantic vs. convoys HX.232, ON.176 and ONS.2. Comprised U-71, U-84, U-108, U-188, U-257, U-381, U-404, U-413, U-438, U-571, U-613, U-615, U-618 and U-662.
Lerche	10 Apr 1943	16 Apr 1943	10	3	1	0	North Atlantic vs. convoy HX.232. Comprised U-168, U-191, U-203, U-260, U-270, U-532, U-563, U-584, U-630 and U-706.
Meise	11 Apr 1943	27 Apr 1943	34	5	2	2	North Atlantic vs. convoys SC.126, HX.234, and ONS.4. Comprised U-71, U-84, U-108, U-134, U-188 †, U-191 †, U-192, U-203, U-209, U-257, U-258, U-267, U-306, U-378, U-381, U-404, U-413, U-415, U-438, U-531, U-532, U-552, U-571, U-598, U-610, U-613, U-618, U-631, U-648, U-662, U-706, U-732 and U-954.
(No Name)	15 Apr 1943	18 Apr 1943	8	1	1	1	Convoy HX 233
Specht	19 Apr 1943	4 May 1943	24	1	0	1	Atlantic, in tandem with Amsel I, Amsel II, Fink and Star, vs. convoys SC.127, SC.128 and ONS.5. Comprised U-84, U-92, U-108, U-125 †, U-168, U-203, U-226, U-257, U-260, U-264, U-270, U-358, U-404, U-438, U-514, U-584, U-614, U-618, U-628, U-630, U-662, U-706, U-707 and U-732. Sank the British Lorient (ONS.5).
Amsel	22 Apr 1943	3 May 1943	16	0	0	0	Atlantic vs. convoys SC.127 and HX.235. Comprised U-186, U-223, U-266, U-267, U-359, U-377, U-383, U-403, U-448, U-366, U-454, U-466, U-468, U-514, U-525, U-634 and U-709.
Star	27 Apr 1943	4 May 1943	16	1	0	0	Atlantic, in tandem with Specht, vs. convoy ONS.5. Comprised U-192, U-209, U-231, U-258, U-378, U-381, U-386, U-413, U-528, U-531, U-532, U-533, U-552, U-648, U-650 and U-954.
Drossel	29 Apr 1943	15 May 1943	13	4	0	7	Atlantic vs. convoys SL.128 and HX.237. Comprised U-89 †, U-221, U-230, U-332 †, U-406, U-436, U-439 †, U-447 †, U-456 †, U-600, U-607, U-659 † and U-753 †.
Amsel 1	3 May 1943	6 May 1943	6	1	0	1	Atlantic vs. Convoy ONS 5, U-267, U-402, U-504, U-575, U-621 and U-638 †. Sank the British Dolius.
Amsel 2	3 May 1943	6 May 1943	6	3	0	0	Atlantic vs. Convoy ONS 5, U-107, U-223, U-266, U-377, U-383 and U-634.
Amsel 3	3 May 1943	6 May 1943	6	0	0	0	Atlantic, U-448, U-468, U-525, U-569, U-709 and U-752.
Amsel 4	3 May 1943	6 May 1943	6	0	0	0	Atlantic, U-103, U-186, U-359, U-403, U-454 and U-466.
Fink	4 May 1943	6 May 1943	28	8	0	5	Atlantic vs. Convoy ONS 5 and Convoy SC 128, with Amsel I, Amsel II, Specht and Star, U-125 †, U-168, U-192 †, U-209, U-226, U-231, U-260, U-264, U-270, U-358, U-378, U-381, U-413, U-438 †, U-514, U-531 †, U-533, U-552, U-584, U-614, U-628, U-630 †, U-648, U-650, U-662, U-707, U-732 and U-954.
Aufnahme	7 Mar 1942	11 Mar 1942	4	0	0	0	Off Norway, U-377, U-403, U-454 and U-589.
(No Name)	5 May 1943	10 May 1943	9	0	0	0	
Elbe	7 May 1943	10 May 1943	16	0	0	0	North Atlantic. Comprised U-107, U-223, U-231, U-266, U-267, U-377, U-383, U-402, U-504, U-514, U-575, U-584, U-614, U-621, U-634 and U-650.
Rhein	7 May 1943	10 May 1943	12	0	0	0	Atlantic vs. convoy HX.237. Formed from the Amsel I and Amsel II packs, comprised U-103, U-186, U-359, U-403, U-448, U-454, U-466, U-468, U-525, U-569, U-709 and U-752.
Elbe 1	10 May 1943	14 May 1943	13	0	0	0	Central North Atlantic vs. convoy HX.237. Comprised U-231, U-267, U-468, U-514, U-525, U-569, U-575, U-584, U-614, U-650, U-709 and U-752.
Elbe 2	10 May 1943	14 May 1943	13	2	0	1	North Atlantic vs. convoy SC.129. Comprised U-103, U-107, U-186 †, U-223, U-359, U-377, U-383, U-402, U-448, U-454, U-466, U-504 and U-621.
Isar	10 May 1943	15 May 1943	4	0	0	0	North Atlantic, in tandem with the Inn wolfpack, vs. convoy ONS.7. Comprised U-304, U-418, U-645 and U-952. On 15 May the Isar, Inn and Nahe wolfpacks combined to create the two Donau wolfpacks.
Nahe	?? May 1943	?? May 1943	?	?	?	?	Unrealised wolfpack in the Atlantic. Absorbed into the Donau I and Donau II wolfpacks.
Lech	10 May 1943	15 May 1943	3	0	0	0	Atlantic, in tandem with Isar and Inn, vs. convoy ONS.7. Comprised U-91, U-202 and U-664. Broken up for incorporation in the Donau wolfpacks.
Inn	11 May 1943	15 May 1943	4	0	0	0	Atlantic, in tandem with Isar vs. convoy ONS.7. Comprised U-92, U-258, U-381 and U-954. On 15 May, Inn and Isar plus the Nahe wolfpack combined to create the two Donau wolfpacks.
Iller	12 May 1943	15 May 1943	6	0	0	1	Greenland−Iceland gap vs. convoy SC.130. Comprised U-340, U-636, U-640 †, U-657, U-731 and U-760.
Naab	12 May 1943	15 May 1943	7	0	0	0	Atlantic. Comprised U-92, U-218, U-264, U-378, U-413, U-552 and U-707.
Donau 1	15 May 1943	26 May 1943	12	1	0	3	North Atlantic vs. convoys ONS.7 and SC.130. Comprised U-304.
Donau 2	15 May 1943	26 May 1943	11	0	0	1	North Atlantic vs. convoy SC.130.
Oder	17 May 1943	19 May 1943	9	0	0	0	Atlantic vs. convoy HX.238. Comprised U-221, U-228, U-336, U-558, U-603, U-642, U-666 and U-752.
Mosel	19 May 1943	24 May 1943	21	0	0	2	Atlantic vs. convoys HX.239, ON.184 and SC.130. Comprised U-218, U-221, U-228, U-231, U-264, U-305, U-336, U-378, U-468, U-552, U-558, U-569 †, U-575, U-603, U-607, U-621, U-641, U-642, U-650, U-666 and U-752 †.
Trutz	1 Jun 1943	15 Jul 1943	18	0	0	1	Atlantic vs. convoys between the US and Gibraltar including GUS.7A. Lost U-217.
Trutz 1	16 Jun 1943	29 Jun 1943	4	0	0	0	Breakup of Trutz into smaller wolfpacks, vs. convoy GUS.8. Comprised U-228, U-558, U-608 and U-642.
Trutz 2	16 Jun 1943	29 Jun 1943	8	0	0	0	Breakup of Trutz into smaller wolfpacks, vs. convoy GUS.8. Comprised U-135, U-232, U-336, U-603, U-641, U-666, U-951 and U-953.
Trutz 3	16 Jun 1943	29 Jun 1943	4	0	0	0	Breakup of Trutz into smaller wolfpacks, vs. convoy GUS.8. Comprised U-193, U-211, U-221 and U-435.
Geier 1	30 Jun 1943	15 Jul 1943	4	0	0	0	One of three sub-operations in Geier in the Atlantic off the Iberian peninsula using boats which had previously been part of the Trutz wolfpack. Comprised U-228, U-603, U-608 and U-641.
Geier 2	30 Jun 1943	15 Jul 1943	4	0	0	2	One of three sub-operations in Geier in the Atlantic off the Iberian peninsula using boats which had previously been part of the Trutz wolfpack. Comprised U-211, U-435 †, U-951 † and U-953.
Geier 3	30 Jun 1943	15 Jul 1943	3	0	0	1	One of three sub-operations in Geier in the Atlantic off the Iberian peninsula using boats which had previously been part of the Trutz wolfpack. Comprised U-232 †, U-336 and U-642.
(No Name)	11 Jul 1943	29 Jul 1943	6	0	0	0	
Wiking	1 Aug 1943	8 Oct 1943	7	4	1	0	Kara Sea vs. convoy VA.18. Comprised U-302, U-307, U-354, U-601, U-703, U-711 and U-960.
Monsun	6 Jul 1943	27 Aug 1943	?	?	?	?	Indian Ocean, by individual boats rather than a wolfpack.
Monsun	30 Aug 1943	23 Nov 1943	8	0	0	0	Between Norway and the Svalbard islands group against Allied Arctic convoys. Comprised U-277, U-307, U-355, U-360, U-387, U-713, U-737 and U-956.
Leuthen	15 Sep 1943	24 Sep 1943	21	10	3	3	Atlantic vs. convoys ON.202 and ONS.18. Comprised U-229 †, U-238, U-260, U-270, U-274, U-305, U-338 †, U-341 †, U-377, U-378, U-386, U-402, U-413, U-422, U-584, U-641, U-645, U-666, U-731, U-758, U-952 and U-963.
Rossbach	24 Sep 1943	9 Oct 1943	26	2	0	6	Atlantic vs. convoys ON.203, ONS.19, HX.258, ON.204, HX.259 and SC.143. Comprised U-91, U-260, U-275, U-279 †, U-305, U-309, U-336 †, U-378, U-389 †, U-402, U-419 †, U-437, U-448, U-539, U-584, U-603, U-610 †, U-631, U-641, U-643 †, U-645, U-666, U-731, U-758, U-762 and U-952. Sank the Free Polish destroyer Orkan.
Schlieffen	14 Oct 1943	22 Oct 1943	18	0	0	5	Atlantic vs. convoys ON.206 and ONS.20. Comprised U-91, U-231, U-267, U-281, U-309, U-413, U-426, U-437, U-448, U-455, U-470 †, U-540 †, U-608, U-631 †, U-762, U-841 †, U-842 and U-844 †.
Eisenbart	22 Oct 1943	5 Jan 1944	12	0	0	0	Arctic Ocean vs. convoys JW.55A, RA.55A and RA.55B. Comprised U-277, U-307, U-314, U-354, U-360, U-387, U-601, U-716 and U-957.
Siegfried	22 Oct 1943	27 Oct 1943	23	0	0	0	Atlantic. Comprised U-91, U-212, U-226, U-231, U-267, U-281, U-309, U-373, U-405, U-413, U-426, U-437, U-552, U-575, U-592, U-608, U-648, U-709, U-762, U-842, U-963, U-967 and U-969.
Schill	25 Oct 1943	16 Nov 1943	10	1	0	2	Atlantic vs. convoys MKS.28, KMS.31, MKS.29A, MKS.30 and SL.139. Comprised U-228, U-262, U-306 †, U-333, U-358, U-466, U-707 † and the anti-aircraft boats U-211, U-441 and U-953.
Siegfried 1	27 Oct 1943	30 Oct 1943	6	0	0	0	First section of Siegfried vs. convoy SC.145. Comprised U-212, U-231, U-405, U-608, U-967 and U-969.
Siegfried 2	27 Oct 1943	30 Oct 1943	8	0	0	0	Second section of Siegfried vs. convoy SC.145. Comprised U-267, U-281, U-413, U-426, U-437, U-552, U-592 and U-963.
Siegfried 3	27 Oct 1943	30 Oct 1943	6	0	0	0	Third section of Siegfried vs. convoy SC.145. Comprised U-226, U-373, U-575, U-648, U-709 and U-842.
Jahn	30 Oct 1943	2 Nov 1943	12	0	0	0	Atlantic. Comprised U-226, U-373, U-426, U-437, U-552, U-575, U-582, U-592, U-608, U-648, U-709 and U-842.
Körner	30 Oct 1943	2 Nov 1943	11	0	0	0	Atlantic vs. convoys ON.208, HX.263 and ONS.21. Comprised U-212, U-231, U-267, U-280, U-281, U-413, U-714, U-843, U-963, U-967 and U-969.
Tirpitz 1	2 Nov 1943	8 Nov 1943	4	0	0	0	Part of a five-part wolfpack in the Atlantic vs. convoy HX.264.
Tirpitz 2	2 Nov 1943	8 Nov 1943	5	0	0	0	Part of a five-part wolfpack in the Atlantic vs. convoy HX.264.
Tirpitz 3	2 Nov 1943	8 Nov 1943	5	0	0	0	Part of a five-part wolfpack in the Atlantic vs. convoy HX.264.
Tirpitz 4	2 Nov 1943	8 Nov 1943	4	0	0	1	Part of a five-part wolfpack in the Atlantic vs. convoy HX.264.
Tirpitz 5	2 Nov 1943	8 Nov 1943	3	0	0	1	Part of a five-part wolfpack in the Atlantic vs. convoy HX.264.
Eisenhart 1	9 Nov 1943	15 Nov 1943	3	0	0	0	One of ten sub-operations in Eisenhart in the North Atlantic vs. convoys HX.264, SC.146 and HX.265.
Eisenhart 2	9 Nov 1943	15 Nov 1943	3	0	0	0	One of ten sub-operations in Eisenhart in the North Atlantic vs. convoys HX.264, SC.146 and HX.265.
Eisenhart 3	9 Nov 1943	15 Nov 1943	3	0	0	0	One of ten sub-operations in Eisenhart in the North Atlantic vs. convoys HX.264, SC.146 and HX.265.
Eisenhart 4	9 Nov 1943	15 Nov 1943	3	0	0	0	One of ten sub-operations in Eisenhart in the North Atlantic vs. convoys HX.264, SC.146 and HX.265.
Eisenhart 5	9 Nov 1943	15 Nov 1943	3	0	0	0	One of ten sub-operations in Eisenhart in the North Atlantic vs. convoys HX.264, SC.146 and HX.265.
Eisenhart 6	9 Nov 1943	13 Nov 1943	1	0	0	0	One of ten sub-operations in Eisenhart in the North Atlantic vs. convoys HX.264, SC.146 and HX.265.
Eisenhart 7	9 Nov 1943	15 Nov 1943	3	0	0	0	One of ten sub-operations in Eisenhart in the North Atlantic vs. convoys HX.264, SC.146 and HX.265.
Eisenhart 8	9 Nov 1943	11 Nov 1943	4	0	0	0	One of ten sub-operations in Eisenhart in the North Atlantic vs. convoys HX.264, SC.146 and HX.265.
Eisenhart 9	9 Nov 1943	11 Nov 1943	3	0	0	0	One of ten sub-operations in Eisenhart in the North Atlantic vs. convoys HX.264, SC.146 and HX.265.
Eisenhart 10	9 Nov 1943	10 Nov 1943	1	0	0	0	One of ten sub-operations in Eisenhart in the North Atlantic vs. convoys HX.264, SC.146 and HX.265.
Schill 1	16 Nov 1943	22 Nov 1943	8	1	0	1	Part of a three-part wolfpack operation in the Atlantic vs. MKS.30. Comprised U-211 †, U-228, U-262, U-333, U-358, U-426, U-515 and U-600. Damaged beyond repair the British sloop HMS Chanticleer (U-515).
Schill 2	17 Nov 1943	22 Nov 1943	9	0	0	1	Part of a three-part wolfpack operation in the Atlantic. Comprised U-86, U-238, U-343, U-536 †, U-582, U-608, U-648, U-709 and U-969.
Schill 3	18 Nov 1943	22 Nov 1943	9	0	0	0	Part of a three-part wolfpack operation in the Atlantic. Comprised U-212, U-391, U-424, U-542, U-618, U-714, U-764, U-843 and U-967.
Weddigen	22 Nov 1943	7 Dec 1943	17	0	0	4	Atlantic vs. convoys KMS.30, OS.59, MKS.31, SL.140, KMS.34 and OS.60. Comprised the remaining boats of the Schill wolfpack, U-86 †, U-107, U-228, U-238, U-262, U-358, U-391, U-424, U-542 †, U-582, U-600 †, U-618, U-648 †, U-714, U-764, U-843 and U-969.
Coronel	4 Dec 1943	8 Dec 1943	19	0	0	0	North Atlantic vs. convoys ONS.24, HX.268 and ON.214. Comprised U-92, U-107, U-269, U-311, U-415, U-421, U-541, U-543, U-544, U-618, U-625, U-629, U-653, U-667, U-672, U-734, U-761, U-801 and U-962.
Coronel 1	8 Dec 1943	17 Dec 1943	19	0	0	1	North Atlantic. Comprised U-92, U-284, U-311, U-364, U-392, U-421, U-471, U-544, U-625, U-629, U-653, U-672, U-741, U-744, U-761, U-960, U-972 †, U-976 and U-981.
Coronel 2	8 Dec 1943	17 Dec 1943	21	0	0	1	North Atlantic. Comprised U-92, U-107, U-302, U-311, U-390, U-415, U-421, U-541, U-543, U-544, U-618, U-625, U-629, U-645 †, U-653, U-667, U-672, U-734, U-761, U-801 and U-962.
Coronel 3	14 Dec 1943	17 Dec 1943	9	0	0	0	North Atlantic. Comprised U-107, U-415, U-541, U-543, U-618, U-645 †, U-667, U-801 and U-962.
Amrum	18 Dec 1943	23 Dec 1943	6	0	0	0	Atlantic vs. various ON, HX and SC convoys. Comprised U-302, U-311, U-392, U-629, U-960 and U-976.
Borkum	18 Dec 1943	3 Jan 1944	17	2	0	1	Atlantic vs. convoys MKS.33−SL.142, OS.62−KMS.36 and MKS.34−SL.143 pairs. Comprised U-107, U-231, U-270, U-275, U-305, U-377, U-382, U-415, U-541, U-618, U-641, U-645 †, U-667, U-758, U-801, U-953 and U-962. Sank two destroyers, the British HMS Hurricane (U-415) and US USS Leary (U-275).
Föhr	18 Dec 1943	23 Dec 1943	6	0	0	0	Atlantic vs. ON, HX and SC series convoys. Comprised U-92, U-421, U-544, U-625, U-653 and U-672.
Sylt	18 Dec 1943	23 Dec 1943	6	0	0	0	Atlantic against several ON, HX and SC convoys. Comprised U-364, U-471, U-741, U-744, U-972 and U-981. The Sylt wolfpack's boats were divided, together with those of the Amrum and Föhr wolfpacks, into the six elements of the Rügen wolfpack.
Rügen 1	23 Dec 1943	7 Jan 1944	8	1	1	0	Part of a seven-part wolfpack operation in the Atlantic vs. convoy ON.217. Comprised U-364, U-545, U-547, U-741, U-744, U-762, U-972 and U-981.
Rügen 2	23 Dec 1943	7 Jan 1944	6	0	0	1	Part of a seven-part wolfpack operation in the Atlantic. Comprised U-364, U-545, U-741, U-744, U-762, U-972 † and U-981.
Rügen 3	23 Dec 1943	7 Jan 1944	8	0	0	0	Part of a seven-part wolfpack operation in the Atlantic. Comprised U-302, U-390, U-392, U-471, U-763, U-846 and U-960.
Rügen 4	23 Dec 1943	7 Jan 1944	9	0	0	0	Part of a seven-part wolfpack operation in the Atlantic. Comprised U-92, U-302, U-311, U-392, U-471, U-846, U-960 and U-976.
Rügen 5	23 Dec 1943	7 Jan 1944	9	0	0	0	Part of a seven-part wolfpack operation in the Atlantic. Comprised U-92, U-260, U-311, U-672, U-757, U-846 and U-976.
Rügen 6	23 Dec 1943	7 Jan 1944	11	0	0	0	Part of a seven-part wolfpack operation in the Atlantic. Comprised U-260, U-309, U-421, U-544, U-625, U-653, U-666, U-672, U-731 and U-976.
Hela	28 Dec 1943	1 Jan 1944	4	0	0	0	Southwestern approaches to the UK. Comprised U-421, U-505, U-618 and U-666.
Rügen 7	28 Dec 1943	2 Jan 1944	3	0	0	0	Part of a seven-part wolfpack operation in the Atlantic. Comprised U-309, U-653 and U-731.
Isegrim	1 Jan 1944	27 Jan 1944	15	3	2	0	Arctic Ocean vs. convoys JW.56A and JW.56B. Comprised U-278, U-312, U-314, U-360, U-425, U-472, U-601, U-636, U-716, U-737, U-739, U-956, U-957 and U-965. Damaged the British destroyer HMS Obdurate (U-360).
Borkum 1	3 Jan 1944	13 Jan 1944	3	1	0	0	West of the Iberian peninsula vs. convoys MKS.35 and SL.144. Comprised U-270, U-305 and U-382. Sank the British frigate HMS Tweed (U-305).
Borkum 2	3 Jan 1944	13 Jan 1944	2	0	0	0	West of the Iberian peninsula. Comprised U-641 and U-758.
Borkum 3	3 Jan 1944	13 Jan 1944	3	0	0	1	West of the Iberian peninsula. Comprised U-231 †, U-377 and U-953.
Rügen	7 Jan 1944	26 Jan 1944	31	0	0	4	Atlantic vs. convoys TU.5 and ON.215. Survivors of seven individually numbered and smaller Rügen groups were assembled into this larger group; comprised U-92, U-212, U-260, U-271, U-281, U-302, U-305 †, U-309, U-311, U-364, U-377 †, U-382, U-390, U-392, U-406, U-471, U-545, U-547, U-571, U-592, U-641 †, U-650, U-666, U-731, U-741, U-757 †, U-762, U-846, U-976, U-981 and U-984.
Hinein	26 Jan 1944	3 Feb 1944	8	0	0	2	Atlantic vs. convoy ON.221. Comprised U-212, U-271 †, U-281, U-441, U-571 †, U-592, U-650 and U-764.
Stürmer	26 Jan 1944	3 Feb 1944	13	0	0	0	Atlantic vs. convoys OS.66 and KMS.40. Comprised U-283, U-309, U-386, U-390, U-406, U-545, U-547, U-666, U-731, U-762, U-984, U-985 and U-989.
Werwolf	27 Jan 1944	28 Feb 1944	21	2	0	1	Norwegian Sea vs. convoys JW.56B, JW.57 and RA.56. Comprised U-278, U-312, U-313, U-314 †, U-362, U-425, U-472, U-601, U-674, U-713, U-716, U-737, U-739, U-956, U-957, U-965, U-973 and U-990. Sank the British destroyers HMS Hardy (U-278) and HMS Mahratta (U-990).
Igel	3 Feb 1944	17 Feb 1944	15	1	0	3	Double operation in the North Atlantic vs. convoys MKS.38, SL.147, UC.12, ON.223, HX.277, OS.67, KMS.41, ONS.29, ON.224, OS.68 and KMS.42.
Hai 1	17 Feb 1944	22 Feb 1944	16	1	0	3	Atlantic vs. convoys HX.278 and ON.224. Comprised U-91, U-212, U-256, U-264 †, U-386 †, U-406 †, U-437, U-441, U-546, U-549, U-603, U-608, U-709, U-764, U-985 and U-989. Sank the British sloop HMS Woodpecker (U-256).
Hai 2	17 Feb 1944	22 Feb 1944	3	0	0	0	Atlantic. Comprised U-281, U-650 and U-963.
Preussen	22 Feb 1944	22 Mar 1944	31	5	1	8	Atlantic vs. convoys SC.153, SL.150, MKS.41, CU.16, SL.154, HX.281 and ON.227. Comprised U-91 †, U-92, U-212, U-255, U-256, U-262, U-267, U-281, U-302, U-311, U-358 †, U-415, U-437, U-441, U-448, U-549, U-575 †, U-603 †, U-608, U-625 †, U-653 †, U-667, U-672, U-709 †, U-741, U-744, U-764 †, U-962, U-963, U-985 and U-986. Sank the British frigate HMS Gould (U-358), British LST-362, US destroyer escort USS Leopold (U-255) and British corvette HMS Asphodel (U-575); damaged the British LST-324.
Hartmut	23 Feb 1944	28 Feb 1944	4	0	0	0	Norwegian Sea vs. convoy JW.57. Comprised U-315, U-366, U-472 and U-673.
Boreas	28 Feb 1944	10 Mar 1944	12	0	0	2	
Orkan	5 Mar 1944	10 Mar 1944	4	0	0	1	Norwegian Sea. Comprised U-288, U-366 †, U-674 and U-990.
Taifun	5 Mar 1944	10 Mar 1944	4	0	0	1	Norwegian Sea. Comprised U-278, U-737 and U-973 †.
Hammer	10 Mar 1944	5 Apr 1944	5	0	0	1	Versus convoy JW.58. Comprised U-288 †, U-354, U-674, U-968 and U-990.
Thor	10 Mar 1944	5 Apr 1944	6	0	0	0	Norwegian Sea vs. convoy JW.58. Comprised U-278, U-307, U-312, U-313, U-361 and U-959.
Blitz	24 Mar 1944	5 Apr 1944	9	0	0	2	Arctic Ocean vs. convoy JW.58. Comprised U-277, U-288, U-315, U-355 †, U-360 †, U-361, U-711, U-956 and U-990.
Donner	5 Apr 1944	20 Apr 1944	9	0	0	0	
Keil	5 Apr 1944	20 Apr 1944	5	1	0	0	Norwegian Sea vs. convoys RA.58 and RA.59. Comprised U-315, U-361, U-711, U-716 and U-739.
Donner; Keil	20 Apr 1944	3 May 1944	14	1	0	2	Northwest Norway vs. convoy RA.59. Donner comprised U-277 †, U-307, U-312, U-315, U-354, U-362, U-636 and U-703. Kiel comprised U-278, U-313, U-361, U-387, U-674 †, U-711 and U-739.
Trutz	3 May 1944	10 Jul 1944	26	0	0	1	
Dragoner	21 May 1944	28 May 1944	6	0	0	0	
Grimm	31 May 1944	6 Jun 1944	10	0	0	0	Area of Norway, Iceland and Spitsbergen. Comprised U-307, U-313, U-315, U-347, U-362, U-387, U-668, U-711, U-742 and U-997.
Greif	3 Aug 1944	26 Sep 1944	6	5	0	1	Kara Sea vs. convoys BD.5 and VD.1. Comprised U-278, U-362 †, U-365, U-711, U-739 and U-957.
Trutz	17 Aug 1944	6 Sep 1944	7	3	0	3	Arctic Ocean vs. convoy JW.59. Comprised U-344 †, U-354, U-363, U-395, U-668, U-703 and U-997. Damaged the British escort carrier HMS Nabob (U-354), sank the British sloop HMS Kite (U-344) and the frigate HMS Bickerton (U-354).
Dachs	31 Aug 1944	5 Sep 1944	6	0	0	0	
Grimm	9 Sep 1944	2 Oct 1944	17	0	0	1	Arctic Ocean. Comprised U-293, U-310, U-312, U-315, U-363, U-365, U-387, U-425, U-636, U-668, U-737, U-921 †, U-956, U-965, U-968, U-992 and U-997.
Feuer	17 Sep 1944	19 Sep 1944	4	0	0	0	Southwest coast of Norway. Comprised U-293, U-310, U-387 and U-737.
Schwefel	22 Sep 1944	25 Sep 1944	3	0	0	0	Arctic Ocean. Comprised U-313, U-668 and U-965.
Zorn	26 Sep 1944	2 Oct 1944	13	2	0	0	Norwegian Sea vs. convoy RA.60. Comprised U-293, U-310, U-315, U-363, U-365, U-387, U-636, U-668, U-771, U-965, U-968, U-992 and U-995.
Regenschirm	14 Oct 1944	16 Oct 1944	4	0	0	0	Off the northwest coast of Norway. Comprised U-293, U-310, U-771 and U-997.
Panther	16 Oct 1944	10 Nov 1944	21	0	1	0	Norwegian Sea vs. convoys RA.61 and JW.61. Comprised U-293, U-295, U-310, U-312, U-315, U-363, U-365, U-387, U-425, U-636, U-668, U-737, U-771, U-956, U-965, U-968, U-992, U-995, U-997 and U-1163. Damaged the British frigate HMS Mounsey (U-295).
Grube	Nov 1944	Dec 1944	7	0	0	0	Arctic Ocean vs. convoy JW.62 supported by Operation Golden. Comprised U-295, U-310, U-387, U-668, U-965, U-997 and U-1163.
Stock	27 Nov 1944	14 Dec 1944	10	?	?	0	Arctic Ocean, in the area to the west of Bjørnøya and in tandem with Grube, vs. convoy JW.62 supported by Operation Golden. Comprised U-286, U-293, U-299, U-313, U-315, U-318, U-363, U-365, U-995 and U-992.
Stier	21 Nov 1944	8 Jan 1945	18	7	1	2	vs. convoys KB.35, RA.62, KB.37 and KP.24.
Stier	30 Dec 1944	21 Jan 1945	7	0	0	0	Arctic Ocean vs. convoy JW.63. Comprised U-299, U-956, U-995 and U-997 deployed in the Bjørnøya Passage, and U-293, U-310 and U-636 deployed off the mouth of the Kola inlet.
Rasmus	6 Feb 1945	13 Feb 1945	8	0	0	0	Arctic Ocean vs. convoys JW.64 and BK.3. Comprised U-286, U-293, U-307, U-318, U-425, U-636, U-711, U-716, U-739, U-968, U-992 and U-995.
Hagen	13 Mar 1945	21 Mar 1945	13	3	0	0	Arctic Ocean vs. convoys JW.65 and RA.65 of Operation Scottish. Comprised U-307, U-310, U-312, U-313, U-318, U-363, U-668, U-711, U-716, U-968, U-992, U-995 and U-997.
Seewolf III	14 Apr 1945	1 May 1945	6	1	0	4	Atlantic. Operation Teardrop. Comprised U-518 †, U-546 †, U-805, U-858, U-880 † and U-1235 †. Sank the US destroyer escort USS Frederick C. Davis (U-546).
Faust	16 Apr 1945	1 May 1945	9	1	0	2	Arctic Ocean vs. Convoy JW 66, Operation Roundel U-278, U-286 †, U-295, U-307 †, U-312, U-313, U-363, U-427 and U-481. Sank the British frigate HMS Goodall (U-286).

== Bibliography ==
- Edwards, Bernard (1996). Dönitz and the Wolf Packs - The U-boats at War. London: Cassell Military Classics. ISBN 0-304-35203-9.
