= Isegrim =

Isegrim or Isegrimm (also Isengrin, Ysengrin, Ysengrimus) may refer to:

- Isengrim, the wolf character in Reynard the Fox
- Ysengrimus a 12th-century series of fables about Ysengrimus the Wolf and Reinardus the Fox
- Der Isegrimm, a poem by Joseph Freiherr von Eichendorff
- Isegrimm, a patriotic novel by Willibald Alexis, published 1864
- Izegrim (band), formerly Isegrim, a female-fronted death/thrash metal band from the Netherlands
- Michael Isengrin, 16th-century printer in Basel, see Horapollo
- Wolfpack Isegrim, a German wolfpack of World War II
- Ysengrin, a wolf-like character in webcomic Gunnerkrigg Court

== See also ==
- Isegrim & Reineke, 2004 TV movie by Éric Berthier
