= HMS Chanticleer (U05) =

Modified Black Swan-class sloop

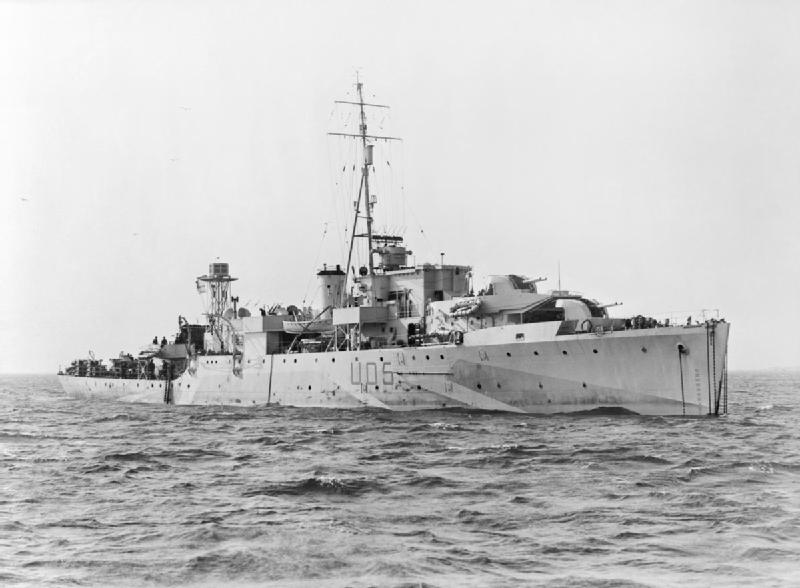
- HMS Chanticleer at the Clyde in 1943.

History

United Kingdom
- Name: Chanticleer
- Namesake: Chanticleer
- Ordered: 9 January 1941
- Builder: William Denny and Brothers, Dumbarton
- Laid down: 6 June 1941
- Launched: 24 September 1942
- Commissioned: 29 March 1943
- Renamed: Hesperides, 1943; Lusitania II, 1943
- Identification: Pennant number: U05
- Motto: Vigil antibus Non Dormientibus ("To watchers not to sleepers")
- Fate: Scrapped in 1946

General characteristics
- Class & type: Modified Black Swan-class sloop
- Displacement: 1,350 tons
- Length: 283 ft (86 m)
- Beam: 38.5 ft (11.7 m)
- Propulsion: Geared turbines; two shafts
- Speed: 20 knots (37 km/h) at 4,300 hp (3,200 kW)
- Complement: 192 men + 1 Cat
- Armament: 6 × QF 4 in Mk XVI anti-aircraft guns; 12 × 20 mm anti-aircraft guns

HMS Chanticleer was a modified Black Swan-class sloop of the Royal Navy. She was laid down by William Denny and Brothers, Dumbarton on 6 June 1941, launched on 24 September 1942 and commissioned on 29 March 1943, with the pennant number U05.

== Construction and career ==
After trials and operational commissioning at Tobermory, in May 1943, the Chanticleer was assigned to the 7th Escort Group based at Greenock for convoy escort missions in the Atlantic.

In June 1943, she took part in various missions to protect convoys such as a floating dock towed from Oban to Malta by the passage through Gibraltar or the KMF18 convoy escort between Gibraltar and the United Kingdom.

In July 1943, the Chanticleer accompanied the KMF19 convoy during the passage through Beach Head, in Sicily, then joined the Eastern Support Force to support the Allied landings, Operation Husky. Upon liberation from Operation Husky, the Chanticleer resumed the escort of the Atlantic convoys and her support functions.

On 15 November 1943, at 3:24 p.m., during the defence of the combined convoy MKS30 and SL139 against the attacks from U-Boats of the Wolfpack Schill 1 (activated from 16 to 22 November 1943 and composed of the following eight U-Boats: U-211, U-228, U-262, U-333, U-358, U-426, U-516 and U-600), HMS Chanticleer was hit by an acoustic torpedo (T5-GNAT) fired from U-515, 400 kilometres east-northeast of the island of San Miguel, Azores. 29 men died. The severely-damaged sloop was towed by HMS Salveda to Horta in the Azores, where she was declared a total loss.

The ship was then transformed into a hulk and used as a base ship for Royal Navy personnel serving in Horta and was renamed Hesperides. On 31 December 1943, her name was changed to Lusitania II, but the ship continued to be used as a base ship for the remainder of the European War when she was deactivated again. She was sold for dismantling in Lisbon in 1946.
