= German submarine U-732 =

German World War II submarine

Coordinates: 35°54′N 05°52′W

History

Nazi Germany
- Name: U-732
- Ordered: 21 November 1940
- Builder: Schichau-Werke, Danzig
- Yard number: 1523
- Laid down: 6 October 1941
- Launched: 18 August 1942
- Commissioned: 24 October 1942
- Fate: Scuttled off Tangiers on 31 October 1943

General characteristics
- Class & type: Type VIIC submarine
- Displacement: 769 t (757 long tons) surfaced; 871 t (857 long tons) submerged
- Length: 67.10 m (220 ft 2 in) (o/a); 50.50 m (165 ft 8 in) (pressure hull)
- Beam: 6.20 m (20 ft 4 in) o/a; 4.70 m (15 ft 5 in) pressure hull
- Height: 9.60 m (31 ft 6 in)
- Draught: 4.74 m (15 ft 7 in)
- Installed power: 2,800–3,200 PS (2,100–2,400 kW; 2,800–3,200 bhp) (diesels); 750 PS (550 kW; 740 shp) (electric)
- Propulsion: 2 shafts; 2 × diesel engines; 2 × electric motors
- Speed: 17.7 knots (32.8 km/h; 20.4 mph) surfaced; 7.6 knots (14.1 km/h; 8.7 mph) submerged
- Range: 8,500 nmi (15,700 km; 9,800 mi) at 10 knots (19 km/h; 12 mph) surfaced; 80 nmi (150 km; 92 mi) at 4 knots (7.4 km/h; 4.6 mph) submerged
- Test depth: 230 m (750 ft); Crush depth: 250–295 m (820–968 ft)
- Complement: 4 officers, 40–56 enlisted
- Armament: 5 × torpedo tubes (four bow, one stern); 14 × 53.3 cm (21 in) torpedoes or 26 TMA mines; 1 × 8.8 cm (3.46 in) deck gun (220 rounds); 2 × twin 2 cm (0.79 in) C/30 anti-aircraft guns

Service record
- Part of: 8th U-boat Flotilla; 24 October 1942 – 30 April 1943; 1st U-boat Flotilla; 1 May – 31 October 1943
- Identification codes: M 49 880
- Commanders: Oblt.z.S. Claus-Peter Carlsen; 24 October 1942 – 31 October 1943
- Operations: 3 patrols: 1st patrol: 8 April – 15 May 1943; 2nd patrol: 10 June – 31 August 1943; 3rd patrol: 17 – 31 October 1943
- Victories: None

German submarine U-732 was a Type VIIC U-boat of Nazi Germany's Kriegsmarine during World War II. The submarine was laid down on 6 October 1941 at the Schichau-Werke yard at Danzig, launched on 18 August 1942, and commissioned on 24 October 1942 under the command of Oberleutnant zur See Claus-Peter Carlsen.

== Design ==
German Type VIIC submarines were preceded by the shorter Type VIIB submarines. U-732 had a displacement of 769 tonnes (757 long tons) when at the surface and 871 tonnes (857 long tons) while submerged. She had a total length of 67.10 m (220 ft 2 in), a pressure hull length of 50.50 m (165 ft 8 in), a beam of 6.20 m (20 ft 4 in), a height of 9.60 m (31 ft 6 in), and a draught of 4.74 m (15 ft 7 in). The submarine was powered by two Germaniawerft F46 four-stroke, six-cylinder supercharged diesel engines producing a total of 2,800 to 3,200 metric horsepower (2,060 to 2,350 kW; 2,760 to 3,160 shp) for use while surfaced, two AEG GU 460/8–27 double-acting electric motors producing a total of 750 metric horsepower (550 kW; 740 shp) for use while submerged. She had two shafts and two 1.23 m (4 ft) propellers. The boat was capable of operating at depths of up to 230 metres (750 ft).

The submarine had a maximum surface speed of 17.7 knots (32.8 km/h; 20.4 mph) and a maximum submerged speed of 7.6 knots (14.1 km/h; 8.7 mph). When submerged, the boat could operate for 80 nautical miles (150 km; 92 mi) at 4 knots (7.4 km/h; 4.6 mph); when surfaced, she could travel 8,500 nautical miles (15,700 km; 9,800 mi) at 10 knots (19 km/h; 12 mph). U-732 was fitted with five 53.3 cm (21 in) torpedo tubes (four fitted at the bow and one at the stern), fourteen torpedoes, one 8.8 cm (3.46 in) SK C/35 naval gun, 220 rounds, and two twin 2 cm (0.79 in) C/30 anti-aircraft guns. The boat had a complement of between forty-four and sixty.

== Service history ==
Attached to 8th U-boat Flotilla based at Danzig, U-732 completed her training period on 30 April 1943 and was assigned to front-line service.

On the third and final war patrol, U-732 was spotted in the afternoon of 31 October 1943 by the British anti-submarine trawler HMS Imperialist off Tangiers. Imperialist made several attacks, throwing a total of 28 depth charges, but was unable to destroy the U-boat. U-732 managed to dive and lay in 180 meters on the sea bed until the oxygen level and became critically low and the batteries were almost discharged. The hopes to escape their pursuers on the surface, were shattered by the presence of HMS Douglas, a British destroyer in the proximity. In the face of the situation, Carlsen decided at 22:30h to order the crew to abandon ship and scuttle the U-boat. Although all crew members made it off U-732, the heavy swell in near total darkness took a heavy toll, only 19 crew members were picked up while 31 perished in the event.

== Bibliography ==
- Busch, Rainer; Röll, Hans-Joachim (1999a). German U-boat commanders of World War II : a biographical dictionary. Translated by Brooks, Geoffrey. London, Annapolis, Md: Greenhill Books, Naval Institute Press. ISBN 1-55750-186-6.
- Busch, Rainer; Röll, Hans-Joachim (1999b). Der U-Boot-Krieg, 1939-1945: Deutsche U-Boot-Verluste von September 1939 bis Mai 1945 [German U-boat losses from September 1939 to May 1945] (in German). Vol. IV. Hamburg, Berlin, Bonn: Mittler. ISBN 3-8132-0514-2.
- Gröner, Eric; Jung, Dieter; Maass, Martin (1991). German Warships 1815-1945: U-boats and Mine Warfare Vessels. Vol. 2. Translated by Thomas, Keith; Magowan, Rachel. London: Conway Maritime Press. ISBN 0-85177-593-4.
