= German submarine U-976 =

German World War II submarine

- U-570 Type VIIC submarine that was captured by the British in 1941. This U-boat is almost identical to U-976.

History

Nazi Germany
- Name: U-976
- Ordered: 5 June 1941
- Builder: Blohm & Voss, Hamburg
- Yard number: 176
- Laid down: 9 July 1942
- Launched: 25 March 1943
- Commissioned: 5 May 1943
- Fate: Sunk on 25 March 1944

General characteristics
- Class & type: Type VIIC submarine
- Displacement: 769 tonnes (757 long tons) surfaced; 871 t (857 long tons) submerged
- Length: 67.10 m (220 ft 2 in) o/a; 50.50 m (165 ft 8 in) pressure hull
- Beam: 6.20 m (20 ft 4 in) o/a; 4.70 m (15 ft 5 in) pressure hull
- Height: 9.60 m (31 ft 6 in)
- Draught: 4.74 m (15 ft 7 in)
- Installed power: 2,800–3,200 PS (2,100–2,400 kW; 2,800–3,200 bhp) (diesels); 750 PS (550 kW; 740 shp) (electric)
- Propulsion: 2 shafts; 2 × diesel engines; 2 × electric motors
- Speed: 17.7 knots (32.8 km/h; 20.4 mph) surfaced; 7.6 knots (14.1 km/h; 8.7 mph) submerged
- Range: 8,500 nmi (15,700 km; 9,800 mi) at 10 knots (19 km/h; 12 mph) surfaced; 80 nmi (150 km; 92 mi) at 4 knots (7.4 km/h; 4.6 mph) submerged
- Test depth: 220 m (720 ft); Crush depth: 250–295 m (820–968 ft)
- Complement: 4 officers, 44–52 enlisted
- Armament: 5 × 53.3 cm (21 in) torpedo tubes (four bow, one stern); 14 × torpedoes or; 26 TMA mines; 1 × 8.8 cm (3.46 in) deck gun (220 rounds); 1 × twin 2 cm (0.79 in) C/30 anti-aircraft gun

Service record
- Part of: 5th U-boat Flotilla; 5 May – 31 October 1943; 7th U-boat Flotilla; 1 November 1943 – 25 March 1944
- Identification codes: M 51 982
- Commanders: Oblt.z.S. Raimund Tiesler; 5 May 1943 – 25 March 1944
- Operations: 2 patrols: 1st patrol: 25 November 1943 – 29 January 1944; 2nd patrol: 20 – 25 March 1944
- Victories: None

German submarine U-976 was a Type VIIC U-boat of Nazi Germany's Kriegsmarine during World War II.

She was ordered on 5 June 1941, and was laid down on 9 July 1942 at Blohm & Voss, Hamburg, as yard number 176. She was launched on 25 March 1943 and commissioned under the command of Oberleutnant zur See Raimund Tiesler on 5 May 1943.

== Design ==
German Type VIIC submarines were preceded by the shorter Type VIIB submarines. U-976 had a displacement of 769 tonnes (757 long tons) when at the surface and 871 tonnes (857 long tons) while submerged. She had a total length of 67.10 m (220 ft 2 in), a pressure hull length of 50.50 m (165 ft 8 in), a beam of 6.20 m (20 ft 4 in), a height of 9.60 m (31 ft 6 in), and a draught of 4.74 m (15 ft 7 in). The submarine was powered by two Germaniawerft F46 four-stroke, six-cylinder supercharged diesel engines producing a total of 2,800 to 3,200 metric horsepower (2,060 to 2,350 kW; 2,760 to 3,160 shp) for use while surfaced, two Garbe, Lahmeyer & Co. RP 137/c double-acting electric motors producing a total of 750 metric horsepower (550 kW; 740 shp) for use while submerged. She had two shafts and two 1.23 m (4 ft) propellers. The boat was capable of operating at depths as low as 230 metres (750 ft).

The submarine had a maximum surface speed of 17.7 knots (32.8 km/h; 20.4 mph) and a maximum submerged speed of 7.6 knots (14.1 km/h; 8.7 mph). When submerged, the boat could operate for 80 nautical miles (150 km; 92 mi) at 4 knots (7.4 km/h; 4.6 mph); when surfaced, she could travel 8,500 nautical miles (15,700 km; 9,800 mi) at 10 knots (19 km/h; 12 mph). U-976 was fitted with five 53.3 cm (21 in) torpedo tubes (four fitted at the bow and one at the stern), fourteen torpedoes or 26 TMA mines, one 8.8 cm (3.46 in) SK C/35 naval gun, 220 rounds, and one twin 2 cm (0.79 in) C/30 anti-aircraft gun. The boat had a complement of between 44 — 52 men.

== Service history ==
On 25 March 1944, U-976 was sunk by aerial gunfire southwest of St. Nazaire, France, in the Bay of Biscay. U-976 was attacked by four British Mosquito FB VIs and two Mosquito FB.XVIIIs (nicknamed Tsetse), armed with 6-pounder 57 mm (2.2 in) cannon, of 248 Squadron RAF. Forty-nine of the crew of fifty-three survived.

The wreck is located at 46.50°N 02.41°W.

=== Wolfpacks ===
U-976 took part in six wolfpacks, namely:

- Coronel 1 (14 – 17 December 1943)
- Amrum (18 – 23 December 1943)
- Rügen 4 (23 – 28 December 1943)
- Rügen 6 (28 December 1943 – 2 January 1944)
- Rügen 5 (2 – 7 January 1944)
- Rügen (7 – 26 January 1944)

== Bibliography ==
- Blair, Clay (2000). Hitler's U-Boat War: The Hunted 1942–1945. Random House. ISBN 0-679-64033-9.
- Busch, Rainer; Röll, Hans-Joachim (1999). German U-boat commanders of World War II : a biographical dictionary. Translated by Brooks, Geoffrey. London, Annapolis, Md: Greenhill Books, Naval Institute Press. ISBN 1-55750-186-6.
- Busch, Rainer; Röll, Hans-Joachim (1999). Der U-Boot-Krieg, 1939-1945: Deutsche U-Boot-Verluste von September 1939 bis Mai 1945 [German U-boat losses from September 1939 to May 1945] (in German). Vol. IV. Hamburg, Berlin, Bonn: Mittler. ISBN 3-8132-0514-2.
- Gröner, Erich; Jung, Dieter; Maass, Martin (1991). U-boats and Mine Warfare Vessels. German Warships 1815–1945. Vol. 2. Translated by Thomas, Keith; Magowan, Rachel. London: Conway Maritime Press. ISBN 0-85177-593-4.
- Helgason, Guðmundur. "U-976". German U-boats of WWII - uboat.net.
