= German submarine U-962 =

German World War II submarine

History

Nazi Germany
- Name: U-962
- Ordered: 5 June 1941
- Builder: Blohm & Voss, Hamburg
- Yard number: 162
- Laid down: 7 April 1942
- Launched: 17 December 1942
- Commissioned: 11 February 1943
- Fate: Sunk on 8 April 1944

General characteristics
- Class & type: Type VIIC submarine
- Displacement: 769 tonnes (757 long tons) surfaced; 871 t (857 long tons) submerged
- Length: 67.10 m (220 ft 2 in) o/a; 50.50 m (165 ft 8 in) pressure hull
- Beam: 6.20 m (20 ft 4 in) o/a; 4.70 m (15 ft 5 in) pressure hull
- Height: 9.60 m (31 ft 6 in)
- Draught: 4.74 m (15 ft 7 in)
- Installed power: 2,800–3,200 PS (2,100–2,400 kW; 2,800–3,200 bhp) (diesels); 750 PS (550 kW; 740 shp) (electric)
- Propulsion: 2 shafts; 2 × diesel engines; 2 × electric motors
- Speed: 17.7 knots (32.8 km/h; 20.4 mph) surfaced; 7.6 knots (14.1 km/h; 8.7 mph) submerged
- Range: 8,500 nmi (15,700 km; 9,800 mi) at 10 knots (19 km/h; 12 mph) surfaced; 80 nmi (150 km; 92 mi) at 4 knots (7.4 km/h; 4.6 mph) submerged
- Test depth: 230 m (750 ft); Crush depth: 250–295 m (820–968 ft)
- Complement: 4 officers, 40–56 enlisted
- Armament: 5 × 53.3 cm (21 in) torpedo tubes (four bow, one stern); 14 × torpedoes or 26 TMA mines; 1 × 8.8 cm (3.46 in) deck gun (220 rounds); 1 × twin 2 cm (0.79 in) C/30 anti-aircraft gun

Service record
- Part of: 5th U-boat Flotilla; 11 February – 31 July 1943; 7th U-boat Flotilla; 1 August 1943 – 8 April 1944
- Identification codes: M 50 679
- Commanders: Oblt.z.S. Ernst Liesberg; 11 February 1943 – 8 April 1944
- Operations: 2 patrols: 1st Patrol: 3 November – 28 December 1943; 2nd Patrol: 14 February – 8 April 1944
- Victories: None

German submarine U-962 was a Type VIIC U-boat built for Nazi Germany's Kriegsmarine during World War II. Her keel was laid at the yards of Blohm & Voss in Hamburg on 7 April 1942. Launched on 17 December 1942, she was formally commissioned on 11 February 1943 and given to Oberleutnant zur See Ernst Liesberg, who commanded the submarine on both of her active war patrols.

== Design ==
German Type VIIC submarines were preceded by the shorter Type VIIB submarines. U-962 had a displacement of 769 tonnes (757 long tons) when at the surface and 871 tonnes (857 long tons) while submerged. She had a total length of 67.10 m (220 ft 2 in), a pressure hull length of 50.50 m (165 ft 8 in), a beam of 6.20 m (20 ft 4 in), a height of 9.60 m (31 ft 6 in), and a draught of 4.74 m (15 ft 7 in). The submarine was powered by two Germaniawerft F46 four-stroke, six-cylinder supercharged diesel engines producing a total of 2,800 to 3,200 metric horsepower (2,060 to 2,350 kW; 2,760 to 3,160 shp) for use while surfaced, two Brown, Boveri & Cie GG UB 720/8 double-acting electric motors producing a total of 750 metric horsepower (550 kW; 740 shp) for use while submerged. She had two shafts and two 1.23 m (4 ft) propellers. The boat was capable of operating at depths of up to 230 metres (750 ft).

The submarine had a maximum surface speed of 17.7 knots (32.8 km/h; 20.4 mph) and a maximum submerged speed of 7.6 knots (14.1 km/h; 8.7 mph). When submerged, the boat could operate for 80 nautical miles (150 km; 92 mi) at 4 knots (7.4 km/h; 4.6 mph); when surfaced, she could travel 8,500 nautical miles (15,700 km; 9,800 mi) at 10 knots (19 km/h; 12 mph). U-962 was fitted with five 53.3 cm (21 in) torpedo tubes (four fitted at the bow and one at the stern), fourteen torpedoes, one 8.8 cm (3.46 in) SK C/35 naval gun, 220 rounds, and one twin 2 cm (0.79 in) C/30 anti-aircraft gun. The boat had a complement of between forty-four and sixty.

== Service history ==
=== War patrols ===
After her working up period ended, U-962 departed Kiel for Bergen, Norway on 23 September 1943, arriving on 27 September. After a stay of about a month, the crew cast off on their first active patrol 3 November 1943. This 56-day cruise in the mid-Atlantic Ocean yielded no targets and the patrol was terminated at St. Nazaire in occupied France on 28 December 1943.

On 14 February 1944, U-962 departed St. Nazaire on her second and last patrol. She again cruised in the central Atlantic for 55 days until she ran afoul of the British sloops HMS Crane and HMS Cygnet and sunk in position 45°43′N 19°57′W by depth charges on 8 April 1944. There were no survivors.

=== Wolfpacks ===
U-962 took part in five wolfpacks, namely:

- Coronel (4 – 8 December 1943)
- Coronel 2 (8 – 14 December 1943)
- Coronel 3 (14 – 17 December 1943)
- Borkum (18 – 26 December 1943)
- Preussen (22 February – 22 March 1944)

== Bibliography ==
- Busch, Rainer; Röll, Hans-Joachim (1999). German U-boat commanders of World War II : a biographical dictionary. Translated by Brooks, Geoffrey. London, Annapolis, Md: Greenhill Books, Naval Institute Press. ISBN 1-55750-186-6.
- Busch, Rainer; Röll, Hans-Joachim (1999). Der U-Boot-Krieg, 1939-1945: Deutsche U-Boot-Verluste von September 1939 bis Mai 1945 [German U-boat losses from September 1939 to May 1945] (in German). Vol. IV. Hamburg, Berlin, Bonn: Mittler. ISBN 3-8132-0514-2.
- Gröner, Erich; Jung, Dieter; Maass, Martin (1991). U-boats and Mine Warfare Vessels. German Warships 1815–1945. Vol. 2. Translated by Thomas, Keith; Magowan, Rachel. London: Conway Maritime Press. ISBN 0-85177-593-4.
- Sharpe, Peter (1998). U-Boat Fact File. Great Britain: Midland Publishing. ISBN 1-85780-072-9.
