= German submarine U-972 =

German World War II submarine

- Type VIIC submarine U-570 which looked almost identical to U-972.

History

Nazi Germany
- Name: U-972
- Ordered: 5 June 1941
- Builder: Blohm & Voss, Hamburg
- Yard number: 172
- Laid down: 15 June 1942
- Launched: 22 February 1943
- Commissioned: 8 April 1943
- Fate: Missing since 15 December 1943 in the North Atlantic. No explanation for her loss.

General characteristics
- Class & type: Type VIIC submarine
- Displacement: 864.7 t (851 long tons) submerged
- Length: 67.10 m (220 ft 2 in) o/a; 50.50 m (165 ft 8 in) pressure hull
- Beam: 6.18 m (20 ft 3 in) o/a; 4.68 m (15 ft 4 in) pressure hull
- Height: 9.60 m (31 ft 6 in)
- Draught: 4.74 m (15 ft 7 in)
- Installed power: 2,800–3,200 PS (2,100–2,400 kW; 2,800–3,200 bhp) (diesels); 750 PS (550 kW; 740 shp) (electric)
- Propulsion: 2 shafts; 2 × 4-stroke M6V 40/46 Germaniawerft; 2 x 62 batteries; 2 x six-cylinder supercharged diesel engines; 2 × electric motors
- Speed: 17.6 knots (32.6 km/h; 20.3 mph) surfaced; 7.5 knots (13.9 km/h; 8.6 mph) submerged
- Range: 8,500 nmi (15,700 km; 9,800 mi) at 10 knots (19 km/h; 12 mph) surfaced; 80 nmi (150 km; 92 mi) at 4 knots (7.4 km/h; 4.6 mph) submerged
- Test depth: 220 m (720 ft); Crush depth: 250–295 m (820–968 ft)
- Complement: 44–57 crew
- Armament: 5 × 53.3 cm (21 in) torpedo tubes (four bow, one stern); 14 × torpedoes; 1 × 8.8 cm (3.46 in) deck gun (220 rounds); 1 x 3.7 cm (1.5 in) Flak M42 anti-aircraft gun

Service record
- Part of: 5th U-boat Flotilla; 8 April – 30 November 1943; 6th U-boat Flotilla; 1 – 15 December 1943
- Identification codes: M 42 135
- Commanders: Oblt.z.S. Klaus-Dietrich König; 8 April – 15 December 1943
- Operations: 1 patrol: 30 November – 15 December 1943
- Victories: None

German submarine U-972 was a Type VIIC U-boat of Nazi Germany's Kriegsmarine during World War II.

== Construction ==
U-972 was laid down on 15 June 1942 at the Blohm & Voss yard in Hamburg, Germany. She was launched on 22 February 1943 and commissioned on 8 April 1943 under the command of Oberleutnant zur See Klaus-Dietrich König. Her U-boat emblem was a skull with tophat.

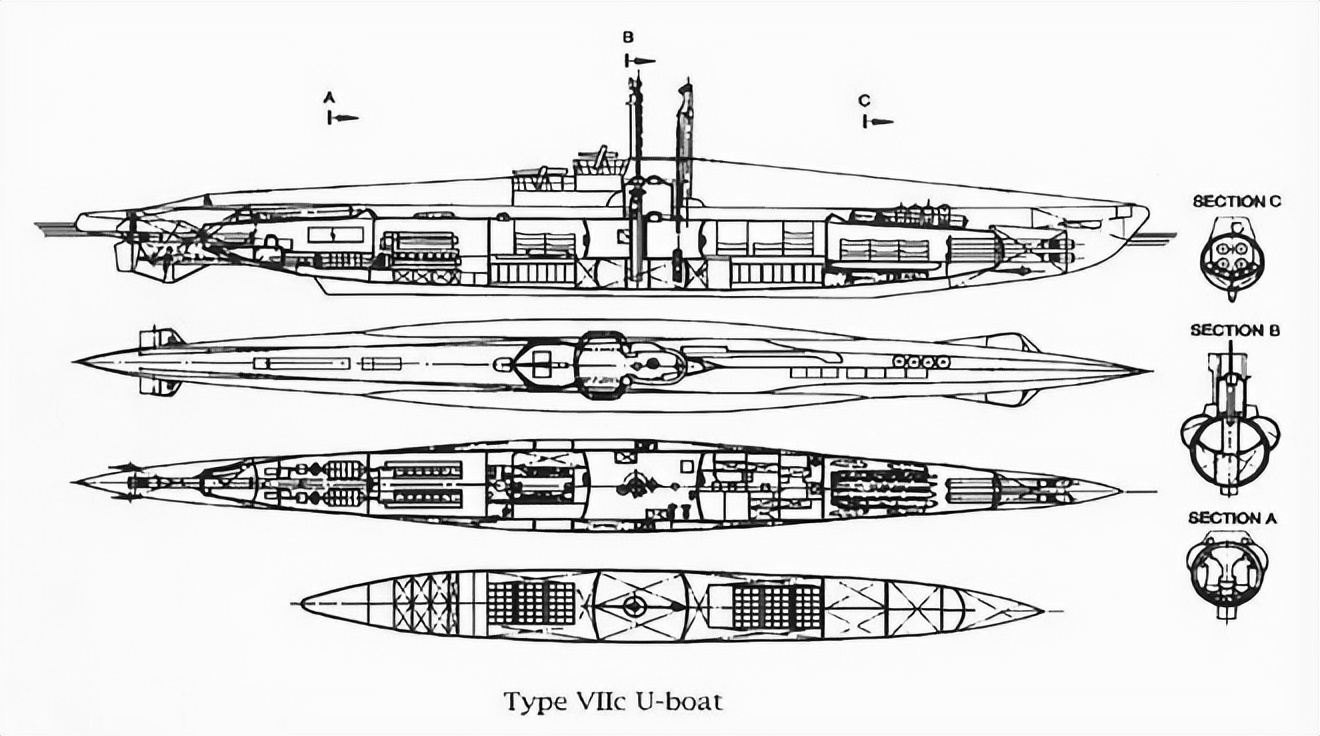
A cross-section of a Type VIIC U-boat.

When she was completed, the submarine was 67.10 metres (220 ft 2 in) long, with a beam of 6.18 metres (20 ft 3 in), a height of 9.60 metres (31 ft 6 in) and a draft of 4.74 metres (15 ft 7 in). She was assessed at 864.7 t (851 long tons) submerged. The submarine was powered by two Germaniawerft F46 four-stroke, six-cylinder supercharged diesel engines producing a total of 2,800 to 3,200 metric horsepower (2,060 to 2,350 kW; 2,760 to 3,160 shp) for use while surfaced and two BBC GG UB 720/8 double-acting electric motors producing a total of 750 metric horsepower (550 kW; 740 shp) for use while submerged. She had two shafts and two 1.23 m (4 ft) propellers. The submarine was capable of operating at depths of up to 230 metres (750 ft), had a maximum surface speed of 17.6 knots (32.6 km/h; 20.3 mph) and a maximum submerged speed of 7.5 knots (13.9 km/h; 8.6 mph). When submerged, the U-boat could operate for 80 nautical miles (150 km; 92 mi) at 4 knots (7.4 km/h; 4.6 mph) and when surfaced, she could travel 8,500 nautical miles (15,700 km; 9,800 mi) at 10 knots (19 km/h; 12 mph).

The submarine was fitted with five 53.3 cm (21 in) torpedo tubes (four fitted at the bow and one at the stern), fourteen torpedoes, one 8.8 cm (3.46 in) deck gun (220 rounds) and a 3.7 cm (1.5 in) Flak M42 anti-aircraft gun. The boat had a complement of 44 to 57 men.

== Service history ==
U-972 was used as a Training ship in the 5th U-boat Flotilla from 8 April 1943 until 30 November 1943 where she had been trained and tested at the individual commands (UAK, TEK, AGRU-Front, etc.) and had been part of Ausbildungsflottillen (26th U-boat Flotilla, 27th U-boat Flotilla, etc.) for remaining works and equipment, before serving in the 6th U-boat Flotilla for active service on 1 December 1943.

=== Wolfpacks ===
U-972 took part in four wolfpacks, namely:

- Coronel (15 – 17 December 1943)
- Sylt (18 – 23 December 1943)
- Rügen 1 (23 – 28 December 1943)
- Rügen 2 (28 December 1943 – 1 January 1944)

== Patrol and loss ==
During her active service, U-972 made one patrol. She left Kiel on 30 November 1943 with 49 crew members and made her way to her operational area in the North Atlantic. Her patrol lasted 16 days before U-972 sent her last radio message on 15 December 1943 from approx. position 60°30′N 20°00′W in the North Atlantic. The submarine was ordered to operate with several wolfpacks during the following weeks and was only reported missing on 1 February 1944 when it failed to arrive at Brest. The submarine was lost with all hands and her wreck has yet to be found.

There is much speculation surrounding the loss of U-972, including that she was sunk by one of her own circling T5 torpedoes or by Allied warships. This was her first and only patrol during World War II. The real reason of her sinking is still unknown as her last resting place remains lost.

== Bibliography ==
- Busch, Rainer; Röll, Hans-Joachim (1999). German U-boat commanders of World War II : a biographical dictionary. Translated by Brooks, Geoffrey. London, Annapolis, Md: Greenhill Books, Naval Institute Press. ISBN 1-55750-186-6.
- Gröner, Erich; Jung, Dieter; Maass, Martin (1991). U-boats and Mine Warfare Vessels. German Warships 1815–1945. Vol. 2. Translated by Thomas, Keith; Magowan, Rachel. London: Conway Maritime Press. ISBN 0-85177-593-4.
