= HMS Nadder =

River-class frigate of the Royal Navy

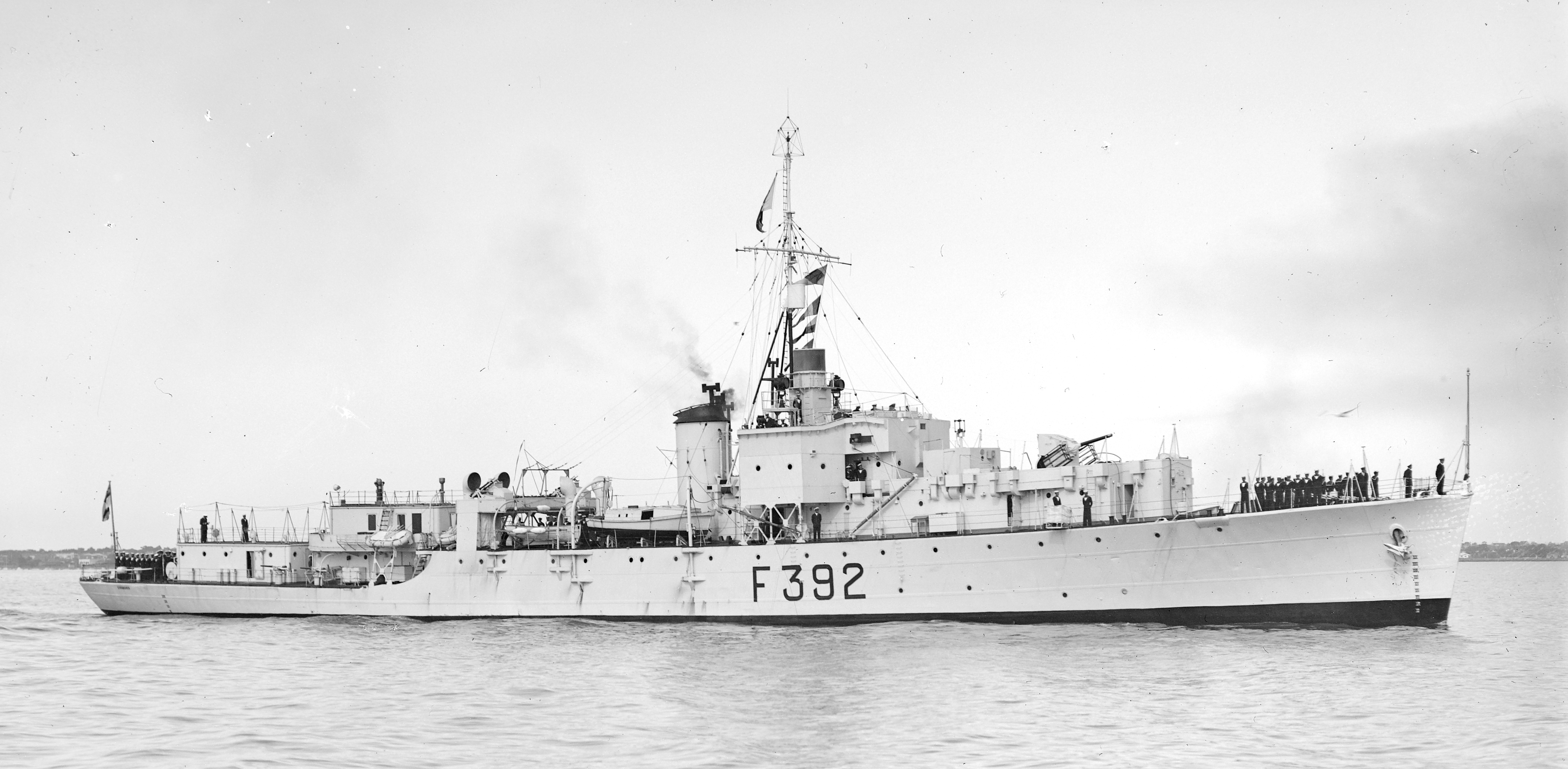
- Shamsher in 1951

History

United Kingdom
- Name: HMS Nadder
- Namesake: River Nadder
- Builder: Smiths Dock Company, South Bank-on-Tees
- Laid down: 11 March 1943
- Launched: 15 September 1943
- Commissioned: 20 January 1944
- Fate: Transferred to the Royal Indian Navy in 1945

British India
- Name: HMIS Shamsher
- Acquired: 1945
- Fate: Transferred to the Pakistani Navy in 1947

Pakistan
- Name: Shamsher
- Acquired: 1947
- Fate: Sold for breaking up on 2 March 1959

General characteristics
- Class & type: River-class frigate
- Displacement: 1,370 long tons (1,390 t; 1,530 short tons); 1,830 long tons (1,860 t; 2,050 short tons) (deep load)
- Length: 283 ft (86.3 m) p/p; 301.25 ft (91.8 m)o/a
- Beam: 36 ft 6 in (11.1 m)
- Draught: 9 ft (2.7 m); 13 ft (4.0 m) (deep load)
- Propulsion: 2 × Admiralty 3-drum boilers, 2 shafts, reciprocating vertical triple expansion, 5,500 ihp (4,100 kW); Parsons single reduction steam turbines, 6,500 shp (4,800 kW)
- Speed: 20 knots (37 km/h; 23 mph); 20.5 knots (38.0 km/h; 23.6 mph) (turbine ships)
- Range: 646 long tons (656 t; 724 short tons) oil fuel; 7,500 nautical miles (13,890 km) at 15 knots (27.8 km/h)
- Complement: 107
- Armament: 2 × QF 4 in (102 mm) /40 Mk.XIX guns, single mounts CP Mk.XXIII; Up to 10 × QF 20 mm Oerlikon A/A on twin mounts Mk.V and single mounts Mk.III; 1 × Hedgehog 24 spigot A/S projector; Up to 150 depth charges

HMS Nadder was a River-class frigate of the Royal Navy during the Second World War. She was transferred to the Royal Indian Navy in 1945 and renamed Shamsher.

== Construction ==
HMS Nadder was built by Smiths Dock Co., Ltd., South Bank-on-Tees in 1943. Nadder was powered by two Admiralty 3-drum type boilers providing a top speed of 20 knots and carried a complement of 118. She was armed with two 4 inch dual-purpose guns and eight 20 mm anti-aircraft guns. She also carried one Anti-Submarine Projector, known as a Hedgehog, and two slides to launch depth charges.

== War service ==
On 10 April 1944 Nadder joined as an escort to Convoy UGS 37 through the Straits of Gibraltar. The convoy came under heavy dive bomber and torpedo attack. One ship was damaged during the encounter, but the escorts did keep the German submarines U-421, U-471 and U-969 at bay.

In April 1944 Nadder was involved with the Greek Naval Mutiny, and captured the corvette Apostolis.

On 12 August 1944 Nadder took part in the sinking of U-198 near the Seychelles, East Africa, in position 03°35′S 52°49′E. On 10 September 1944 Nadder rescued survivors from a U-boat attack on the British merchant SS Troilus. Carrying coconut oil, tea and copra for the Ministry of Food, Troilus was homeward bound from Colombo. She was sailing independently via Suez but was torpedoed and sunk by U-859 300 miles north east of Socotra Island on 1 September 1944. HMS Taff and Nadder were sent to search for survivors and on 10 September they rescued 95 survivors of the attack and landed them at Aden 10 days later.

On 7 August 1945 Nadder was involved in an OSS operation off the west coast of Sumatra. The National Archives have an admiralty document reference ADM 1/30567 mentioning awards to three of Nadder's ratings of Nadder for services during search for a missing OSS team on the west coast of Sumatra 7–11 August 1945 (Operation CAPRICE V). Temporary Acting Lieutenant-Commander Kitto is mentioned in despatches along with Engine Room Artificer Third Class Quintrell and Petty Officer Eustis "for bravery, skill and determination whilst serving in Nadder, in successfully beating off an enemy air attack on 10 August 1945, whilst engaged in a special operation many hundreds of miles from any supporting force".

Reports from veteran Nadder crew members indicate that the ship may have been one of the last ships to be bombed after the atomic bombings of Hiroshima and Nagasaki.

== Post-war service ==
In 1945, Nadder was transferred into Royal Indian Navy and renamed HMIS Shamsher. In February 1946, the Indian Navy mutinied. Shamsher was the only ship in Bombay not to mutiny. Shamsher was underway at sea during the mutiny, however, her commanding officer, Lt. Nilakanta Krishnan, submitted testimony to the Commission of Inquiry stating that the fact that the ship's officers were primarily of Indian origin, unlike many ships of the RIN, may also have been a reason for the ratings not joining the mutiny. From there she passed to the Pakistani Navy in 1947 being used as a training ship. She was eventually sold for breaking up on 2 March 1959.

== Publications ==
- Colledge, J. J.; Warlow, Ben (2006) [1969]. Ships of the Royal Navy: The Complete Record of All Fighting Ships of the Royal Navy from the 15th Century to the Present (3rd Rev ed.). London: Chatham Publishing. ISBN 978-1-86176-281-8. OCLC 67375475.
