= Mediterranean U-boat campaign of World War II =

German naval activity

Mediterranean U-boat Campaign
- Part of the Battle of the Mediterranean of the Second World War
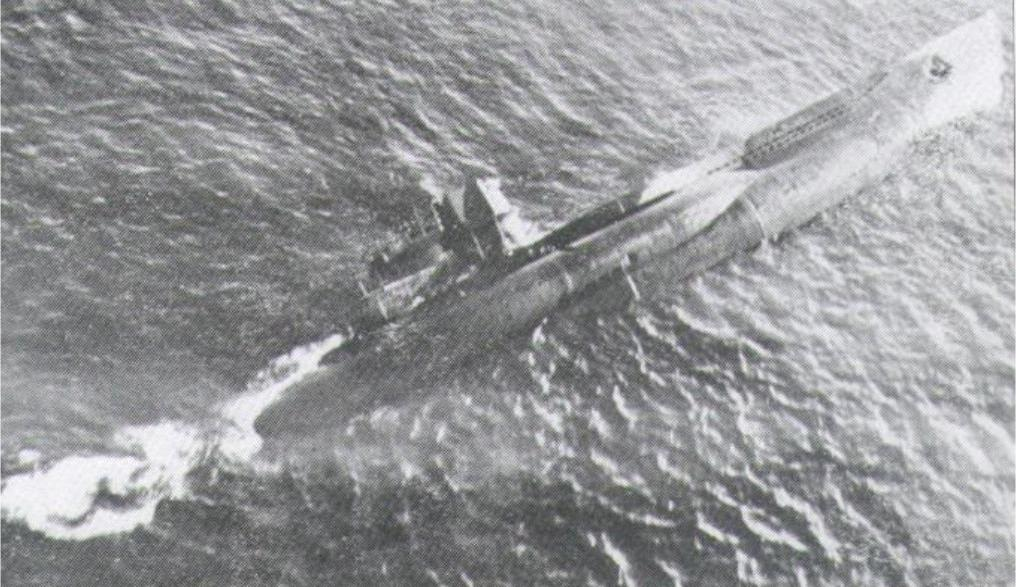
- U-617 aground near Melilla, at position 35.38°N 03.27°W after British air attack on 12 September 1943
Date	21 September 1941 to May 1944
Location	Mediterranean Sea 35°N 18°E
Result	Allied victory

Belligerents
Royal Navy; Royal Australian Navy; United States Navy; Other Allied navies	Kriegsmarine

Strength
	62 U-boats

Casualties and losses
95 merchant ships sunk 24 big warships sunk	62 U-boats lost

The Mediterranean U-boat Campaign lasted from about 21 September 1941 to 19 September 1944 during the Second World War. Malta was an active British base strategically located near supply routes from Europe to North Africa. Axis supply convoys across the Mediterranean Sea suffered severe losses, which in turn threatened the fighting ability of the Axis armies in North Africa. The Allies were able to keep their North African armies supplied. The Kriegsmarine tried to isolate Malta but later it concentrated its U-boat operations on disrupting Allied landing operations in southern Europe.

Some 60 German U-boats made the hazardous passage into the Mediterranean Sea from 1941; however, none successfully returned to the Atlantic. Karl Dönitz, the Commander-in-Chief, U-boats, Befehlshaber der Unterseeboote (BdU) was always reluctant to send his boats into the Mittelmeer but he recognised that natural bottlenecks such as the Straits of Gibraltar were more likely to result in shipping being found and attacked than relying on finding it in the vast Atlantic Ocean.

The U-boats were sent to assist the Italians, although many were attacked in the Strait of Gibraltar and nine were sunk while attempting the passage and ten more were damaged. The Mediterranean is a clear and calm body of water which made escape more difficult for the U-boats. The Axis failed in their objective.

== Prior Experience ==
The Kriegsmarine had acquired some knowledge of the area. Dönitz was an officer aboard UB-68 which had been sunk in the region in World War I. U-boats had also served in the Spanish Civil War. The Republicans, with twelve submarines, opposed the Nationalists, who had none; the presence of German U-boats was most welcome. The first two vessels, U-33 and U-34, under the codename Training Exercise Ursula, left Wilhelmshaven on 20 November 1936. Both submarines sailed down the English Channel and slipped into the Mediterranean on the night of 27 November. They were soon in action, U-34 fired a single torpedo at a Republican destroyer in the evening of 1 December. The projectile missed, impacting on rocks. The boat, under Leutnant zur See Harald Grosse, tried again on 5 and 8 December, with an equal lack of success. U-33 fared no better; her commander was frustrated by the absence of target identification or defensive movement of his intended victims. Only one vessel was sunk by the U-boats, the Republican submarine C-3, which was attacked by U-34 on 12 December.

== The early years ==
By October 1939, Dönitz had decided to use three longer-range boats to intercept the first Allied convoys of the war. U-25, U-26 and U-53 were to rendezvous southwest of Ireland before attempting to force the Straits and attack the convoys in the Mediterranean. Things went quickly wrong, U-25 was diverted to a convoy south-west of Lisbon. After an abortive torpedo attack on a steamer on 31 October, Viktor Schütze, U-25's commander, surfaced and proceeded to sink his target with fire from his deck gun. This course of action caused a crack in a vital part of the submarine, obliging the boat to return to Germany. U-53 ran low on fuel after shadowing a convoy in the Bay of Biscay and was also forced to return. U-26, was compelled by a combination of unsuitable weather, searchlights and British anti-submarine patrols, to abandon an attempt to lay mines near Gibraltar harbour. The boat sailed through the Straits on the surface and claimed but a solitary ship sunk in the Mediterranean. This 'sinking' was not confirmed by post-war analysis.

U-26 headed back through the Straits, arriving in Wilhelmshaven on 5 December 1939; the only U-boat to enter and leave the Mediterranean in the war. This mission was summed-up in the BdU Kriegstagebuch (KTB) War Diary,

It was a mistake to send U-25, U-26 and U-53 into the Mediterranean. U-25 had to return before she ever got there, U-53 did not get through and U-26 hardly encountered any shipping worth mentioning. This patrol shows all the disadvantages of a long outward passage.|KTB

Many attacks mentioned were gun actions or ramming, particularly at the eastern end of the Mediterranean. This was because the potential target was "unworthy or [a] difficult torpedo target".

== Afrika Korps ==
The 23rd U-boat Flotilla was established in September 1941 to intercept coastal shipping supplying Allied forces in the Siege of Tobruk. U-boats patrolled the eastern Mediterranean from the 23rd flotilla base on Salamis Island in Greece. On 7 December, control of the 23rd Flotilla was transferred from Kernével to The Commander in Chief in the South (Oberbefehlshaber Süd, OB Süd) Albert Kesselring. Additional bases were established in Pula in Croatia and La Spezia in northern Italy as more U-boats were ordered to the Mediterranean, until focus shifted to the western Atlantic through the Second Happy Time.

- U-371 passed Gibraltar on 21 September 1941.
- U-559 passed Gibraltar on 26 September 1941, and sank HMAS Parramatta on 27 November, the 3,059-ton Shuntien of convoy TA 5 on 23 December, and the 2,487-ton Warszawa of convoy AT 6 on 26 December.
- U-97 passed Gibraltar on 27 September 1941, sank the 1,208-ton Samos and the 758-ton Pass of Balmaha on 17 October.
- U-331 passed Gibraltar on 30 September, destroyed a 372-ton British landing craft on 10 October, and sank HMS Barham on 25 November 1941.
- U-75 passed Gibraltar on 3 October, sank two 372-ton British landing craft on 12 October, and sank the 1,587-ton Volo of convoy ME 8 before being sunk by convoy escort HMS Kipling on 28 December 1941.
- U-79 passed Gibraltar on 5 October, damaged HMS Gnat on 21 October, and was sunk on 23 December 1941 by Royal Navy destroyers.
- U-205 passed Gibraltar on 11 November 1941.
- U-81 passed Gibraltar on 12 November and sank HMS Ark Royal on 13 November 1941.
- U-433 was sunk near Gibraltar on 16 November 1941 by HMS Marigold.
- U-565 passed Gibraltar on 16 November 1941.
- U-431 passed Gibraltar on 24 November 1941 and damaged the 3,560-ton Myriel on 13 December.
- U-557 passed Gibraltar on 26 November, sank the 4,032-ton Fjord on 2 December, then sank HMS Galatea on 15 December, and was sunk on 16 December 1941 by the Italian torpedo boat Orione.
- U-562 passed Gibraltar on 27 November 1941 and sank the 4,274-ton Grelhead on 2 December.
- U-95 was torpedoed by the Dutch submarine O 21 while passing Gibraltar on 28 November 1941.
- U-652 passed Gibraltar on 29 November 1941, sank the 1,595-ton Saint Denis on 9 December, and sank the 6,557-ton Varlaam Avanesov on 19 December.
- U-372 passed Gibraltar on 8 December 1941.
- U-375 passed Gibraltar on 9 December 1941.
- U-453 passed Gibraltar on 9 December 1941 and sank the Spanish ship Badalona on 13 December.
- U-374 sank the trawler HMS Lady Shirley and the patrol yacht HMS Rosabelle while passing Gibraltar on 10 December 1941 and was torpedoed by HMS Unbeaten on 12 January 1942.
- U-568 passed Gibraltar on 10 December 1941 and sank HMS Salvia on 24 December
- U-74 passed Gibraltar on 15 December 1941.
- U-77 passed Gibraltar on 16 December 1941 and damaged HMS Kimberley on 12 January 1942.
- U-83 passed Gibraltar on 18 December 1941.
- U-573 passed Gibraltar on 18 December 1941 and sank the 5,289-ton Hellen on 21 December.
- U-451 was sunk by Fairey Swordfish from 812 Naval Air Squadron while passing Gibraltar on 21 December 1941.
- U-133 passed Gibraltar on 21 December 1941.
- U-577 passed Gibraltar on 23 December 1941 and was sunk by aircraft on 9 January 1942.
- U-73 passed Gibraltar on 14 January.
- U-561 passed Gibraltar on 15 January 1942

== Second Happy Time ==
La Spezia became headquarters when the Mediterranean U-boats were reorganized as the 29th U-boat Flotilla in May 1942. No more U-boats were assigned to the Mediterranean from mid-January to early October 1942 as opportunities along the east coast of North America seemed more productive while the Afrika Korps was successfully advancing on Egypt. The 29th flotilla focused on convoys supplying Malta and British forces on the Egyptian coast. For sustained operations, U-boats spent approximately one-third of the time on patrol stations, one-third in transit to and from base for routine provisioning and refueling, and one-third undergoing major overhaul or battle repair. 29th flotilla target strength of twenty U-boats enabled a routine patrol strength of three U-boats from Salamis in the eastern Mediterranean, and three from La Spezia in the western Mediterranean. Loss of U-372 and U-568 in twelve-hour sustained attacks demonstrated vulnerability of independent U-boat patrols to a team of destroyers which could hunt a submerged U-boat to exhaustion of air and battery power, rather than moving on after a few attacks.

- U-73 sank HMS Eagle on 11 August 1942.
- U-74 was sunk on 2 May 1942 by aircraft and destroyers.
- U-77 sank HMS Grove on 12 June. U-77 then sank sailing ships Vassiliki on 22 July, Toufic El Rahman on 24 July, Fany on 30 July, and Saint Simon on 1 August. U-77 continued patrolling the coast of Cyprus, Palestine and Lebanon damaging Adnan and sinking Ezzet on 6 August, Kharouf on 10 August and Daniel on 16 August 1942.
- U-81 sank the 6,018-ton Caspia, the French trawler Viking, and sailing ships Bab el Faraq and Farouh el Kher on 16 April 1942. U-81 sank sailing ships Hefz el Rahman on 19 April, Aziza and the El Saadiah on 22 April, and then 2,073-ton Havre of convoy AT 49 on 10 June 1942.
- U-83 damaged the 2,590-ton Crista on 17 March 1942, sank the 100-ton Esther and the 231-ton Said on 8 June, the 175-ton Typhoon on 9 June, the Q-ship HMS Farouk on 13 June, and the 5,875-ton Princess Marguerite on 17 August 1942.
- U-97 sank the 1,755-ton Memas and the 1,433-ton Zealand from convoy Metril on 28 June 1942, and sank the 786-ton Marilyse Moller on 1 July.
- U-133 sank HMS Gurkha on 17 January 1942 and sank after striking a mine off Salamis on 12 March 1942.
- U-205 sank the 2,623-ton Slavol on 26 March 1942, and sank HMS Hermione on 16 June 1942.
- U-331 shelled the Beirut electric power station in April 1942.
- U-371
- U-372 sank HMS Medway on 30 June 1942, and was hunted to exhaustion on 3 August 1942.
- U-375 sank the 1,376-ton Hero on 6 July 1942, sank the 87-ton Amina and the 176-ton Ikbal on 30 July, and damaged the 6,288-ton Empire Kumari of convoy LW 38 on 26 August. She also sank the 558-ton Arnon, the 38-ton Miriam and the 108-ton Salina on 3 September. She then sank the 113-ton Turkian on 6 September 1942.
- U-431 sank the trawler HMS Sotra on 29 January 1942, she then sank the 4,216-ton Eocene of convoy AT 46 on 20 May, and damaged LCT-119 on 20 June 1942.
- U-453 damaged the hospital ship Somersetshire on 7 April 1942.
- U-559 sank the 4,681-ton Athene and damaged the 5,917-ton Brambleleaf of convoy AT 49 on 10 June 1942.
- U-561 planted a minefield at the mouth of the Suez Canal, sinking the 6,692-ton Mount Olympus, and damaging the 5,062-ton Hav and the 4,043-ton Fred.
- U-562 damaged the 3,359-ton Adinda on 24 July 1942.
- U-565 sank HMS Naiad on 11 March 1942 and the 1,361-ton Kirkland of convoy TA 36 on 23 April.
- U-568 was hunted to exhaustion on 28 May 1942.
- U-573 was interned in Spain following bomb damage on 1 May 1942.
- U-652 sank HMS Heythrop on 20 March 1942, sank HMS Jaguar on 26 March and was sunk on 2 June 1942 by 815 Naval Air Squadron.

== Allied invasion of North Africa ==
More U-boats were assigned to the 29th flotilla when improved anti-submarine warfare (ASW) measures along the east coast of North America ended the Second Happy Time. When a Short Sunderland found U-559, the aircraft summoned five destroyers able to maintain contact and drop 150 depth charges over ten hours, until the submarine attempted to sneak away on the surface at night. Waiting destroyers open fire as soon as the U-boat surfaced and the U-boat crew abandoned ship. The Royal Navy boarded the sinking U-boat and recovered German code documents before U-559 sank.

The Second Battle of El Alamein prompted a concentration of U-boats in the western Mediterranean, in anticipation of Allied amphibious invasion. Five U-boats made contact with Operation Torch convoys, and two wolfpacks assembled near the invasion points. U-73, U-81, U-458, U-565, U-593, U-595, U-605 and U-617 assembled around Oran as Gruppe Delphin (Group Dolphin); U-77, U-205, U-331, U-431, U-561 and U-660 assembled around Algiers as Gruppe Hai (Group Shark). Five U-boats were sunk opposing the invasion.

- U-73 damaged the 7,453-ton Lalande on 14 November 1942 and sank the Liberty ship Arthur Middleton of convoy UGS 3 on 1 January 1943.
- U-77 sank the 18-ton Mahrous on 20 October 1942, damaged HMS Stork on 12 November, and sank the 6,699-ton Empire Banner and the 7,043-ton Empire Webster of convoy KMS 8 on 7 February. U-77 damaged the 5,222-ton Hadleigh and the 5,229-ton Merchant Prince of convoy ET 14 on 16 March and was sunk on 29 March 1943 by Lockheed Hudsons.
- U-81 sank the 2,012-ton Garlinge on 10 November 1942 and the 6,487-ton Maron on 13 November. U-81 damaged the 6,671-ton Saroena on 10 February 1943 and sank sailing ships Al Kasbanah, Dolphin, Husni, and Sabah el Kheir on 11 February. U-81 sank the 244-ton Bourghieh and sailing ship Mawahab Allah on 20 March 1943, and sailing ship Rousdi on 28 March.
- U-83 was sunk on 23 March 1943 by a Lockheed Hudson of 500 Squadron RAF.
- U-97 was under repair at Salamis.
- U-205 was sunk on 17 February 1943 by aircraft and destroyers.
- U-331 sank USS Leedstown on 9 November 1942 before being sunk by aircraft on 17 November.
- U-371 sank the trawler HMS Jura and damaged the 7,159-ton Ville de Strasbourg of convoy MKS 5 on 7 January 1943 before sinking the 2,089-ton Fintra on 23 February and damaging the Liberty ship Daniel Carroll of convoy TE 16 on 28 February.
- U-375 damaged HMS Manxman on 1 December 1942.
- U-431 sank HMS Martin on 10 November 1942, HNLMS Isaac Sweers on 13 November, and sailing ships Alexandria on 23 January 1943, Mouyassar and Omar el Kattab on 25 January, and Hassan on 26 January, before damaging the 6,415-ton City of Perth of convoy MKS 10 on 26 March 1943.
- U-453 sank the 5,859-ton Jean Jadot of convoy KMS 7 on 20 January 1943.
- U-559 sank 200-ton Bringhi on 12 October 1942 and was hunted to exhaustion on 30 October.
- U-561 sank 39-ton Sphinx on 24 September 1942.
- U-562 sank the 23,722-ton Strathallan of convoy KMF 5 on 21 December 1942, and was sunk on 23 February 1943 by aircraft and destroyers.
- U-565 sank HMS Partridge on 18 December 1942, damaged the Liberty ship Nathanael Greene of convoy MKS 8 on 24 February 1943, and damaged the 10,389-ton Seminole of convoy TE 16 on 27 February.

=== Replacement U-boats ===
- U-605 passed Gibraltar on 10 October and was sunk off Oran on 14 November 1942 by a Lockheed Hudson of No. 233 Squadron RAF.
- U-458 passed Gibraltar on 11 October 1942.
- U-593 passed Gibraltar on 11 October 1942; and sank 5,332-ton Browning of convoy KMS 2 on 12 November 1,940-ton Daflia and 2,626-ton Kaying on 18 March 1943, and 5,157-ton City of Guildford of convoy XT 7 on 27 March.
- U-660 passed Gibraltar on 11 October and was sunk off Oran on 12 November 1942 by destroyers.
- U-617 passed Gibraltar on 8 November 1942, sank the tug HMS Saint Issey on 28 December, 5,324-ton Annitsa and 1,862-ton Harboe Jensen on 15 January 1943, HMS Welshman on 1 February, and 3,264-ton Corona and 1,350-ton Henrik of convoy AW 22 on 5 February.
- U-407 passed Gibraltar on 9 November 1942 and sank the 19,627-ton Viceroy of India on 11 November.
- U-595 passed Gibraltar on 9 November and was sunk off Oran on 14 November 1942 by Lockheed Hudsons.
- U-596 passed Gibraltar on 9 November 1942, sank LCI-162 on 7 February 1943, damaged 7,047-ton Empire Standard and Fort ship Fort Norman of convoy KMS 10 on 9 March, and sank Fort ship Fort a la Corne and 9,551-ton Hallanger of convoy ET 16 on 30 March 1943.
- U-755 passed Gibraltar on 9 November 1942 and sank the trawler Sergent Gouarne on 26 March 1943.
- U-259 passed Gibraltar on 11 November and was sunk on 15 November 1942 by a Lockheed Hudson of No. 500 Squadron RAF.
- U-380 passed Gibraltar and sank 11,069-ton Nieuw Zealand on 11 November 1942, and damaged Ocean ship Ocean Seaman of convoy ET 14 on 15 March 1943.
- U-443 passed Gibraltar on 5 December 1942, and sank HMS Blean on 11 December and 1592-ton Edencrag of convoy TE 9 on 14 December before being sunk by destroyers on 23 February 1943.
- U-602 passed Gibraltar on 8 December 1942 and damaged HMS Porcupine on 9 December.
- U-301 passed Gibraltar on 9 December 1942 and was torpedoed by HMS Sahib on 20 January 1943.
- U-224 passed Gibraltar on 9 January 1943 and was sunk on 13 January by HMCS Ville de Quebec.

== Axis defeat in Tunisia ==
Allied armies advancing through North Africa and Sicily constructed a system of airfields increasing the frequency of U-boat detection by aircraft. The 29th Flotilla focused on western Mediterranean convoys supplying Allied troops but three U-boats were based at Salamis to maintain an eastern Mediterranean patrol presence, forcing the Allies to disperse their ASW efforts. On 1 August 1943 the 29th Flotilla shifted its headquarters from La Spezia to Toulon where it could use the former French naval base for patrols in the western Mediterranean.

- U-73 sank the 1,598-ton Brinkburn of convoy TE 22 on 21 June, and damaged the 8,299-ton Abbeydale of convoy XTG 2 on 27 June 1943.
- U-81 sank the 8,131-ton Yoma of convoy GTX 2 on 17 June, the sailing ship Nisr on 25 June, sailing ships Nelly and Toufic Allah on 26 June, and the 3,742-ton Michalios on 27 June, before damaging the 7,472-ton Empire Moon on 22 July.
- U-97 sank the 1,179-ton Palima on 12 June 1943 and the 8,995-ton Athelmonarch on 15 June before being sunk on 16 June by a Lockheed Hudson of No. 459 Squadron RAAF.
- U-371 sank the 1,162-ton Merope on 27 April, damaged the Liberty ship Matthew Maury and the 6,561-ton Gulfprince of convoy ET 22A on 10 July 1943, and sank the 6,004-ton Contractor of convoy GTX 5 on 7 August 1943.
- U-375 sank the 5,634-ton Saint Essylt of convoy KMS 18B on 4 July 1943 before being sunk on 30 July 1943 by PC-624.
- U-380 damaged Liberty ship Pierre Soulé on 23 August 1943.
- U-407 damaged HMS Newfoundland on 23 July 1943.
- U-453 damaged the 6,894-ton Oligarch of convoy GTX 3 on 30 June, and sank the 5,454-ton Shahjehan of convoy MWS 36 on 6 July 1943.
- U-458 was sunk on 22 August 1943 by the escort of convoy MKF 22.
- U-561 was sunk on 12 July 1943 by MTB-81.
- U-565 sank the 5,594-ton Michigan and 4,392-ton Sidi-Bel-Abbès of convoy UGS 7 on 20 April 1943.
- U-593 sank 1858-ton Runo on 11 April, then damaged LST-333 and LST-387 on 22 June and sank 6,054-ton Devis of convoy KMS 18B on 5 July 1943.
- U-596 sank 68-ton El Sayeda on 20 August 1943 and 130-ton Lily, 50-ton Namaz and 21-ton Panikos on 21 August. U-596 then sank 183-ton Nagwa on 30 August and 80-ton Hamidieh on 7 September.
- U-602 was lost to unknown causes in April 1943.
- U-617 sank HMS Puckeridge on 6 September.
- U-755 sank 928-ton Simon Duhamel II of convoy TE 20 on 2 April before being sunk by a Lockheed Hudson of No. 608 Squadron RAF on 28 May 1943.

=== Replacements ===
- U-303 passed Gibraltar on 9 April and was torpedoed by HMS Sickle on 21 May 1943.
- U-414 passed Gibraltar on 9 April, sank 5979-ton Empire Eve and damaged Fort ship Fort Anne of convoy KMS 14 on 18 May before being sunk on 25 May 1943 by HMS Vetch.
- U-410 passed Gibraltar on 6 May 1943, and sank Liberty ships Richard Henderson and John Bell of convoy UGS 14 on 23 August 1943.
- U-447 was sunk off Gibraltar on 7 May 1943 by Lockheed Hudsons of No. 233 Squadron RAF.
- U-616 passed Gibraltar on 7 May 1943.
- U-409 passed Gibraltar on 5 June, sank the 8,762-ton City of Venice on 4 July and was sunk on 12 July 1943 by HMS Inconstant.

== After the Italian armistice ==
As Allied escort forces in the Mediterranean became more numerous, the tactic of hunting a detected U-boat to exhaustion was given the name Swamp and used with increasing frequency. U-boats launched G7es torpedoes with passive homing against destroyers, but were unable to cope with a team of escorts. U-boats remaining in port were subjected to USAAF air raids from newly constructed airfields. Surviving U-boats at Toulon were scuttled when Operation Dragoon, (the invasion of southern France), closed the 29th Flotilla base on 15 August 1944. Three U-boats remained at Salamis until Allied forces reached them on 19 September 1944.

- U-73 damaged the Liberty ship John S. Copley of convoy GUS 24 and was sunk by the convoy escort on 16 December 1943.
- U-81 sank the 2,887-ton Empire Dunstan on 18 November 1943 before being destroyed by a 9 January 1944 USAAF raid on Pula.
- U-371 sank HMS Hythe on 11 October, USS Bristol on 13 October, and damaged the Liberty ship James Russell Lowell of convoy GUS 18 on 15 October. U-371 sank the 17,024-ton Dempo and destroyed the 6,165-ton Maiden Creek of convoy SNF 17 on 17 March 1944 and damaged USS Menges and the French destroyer escort Sénégalais from convoy GUS 38 with G7es torpedoes on 3 May 1944 while being hunted to exhaustion by convoy escorts.
- U-380 was destroyed by an 11 March 1944 USAAF raid on Toulon.
- U-407 damaged HMS Birmingham on 28 November 1943, sank 55-ton Rod el Faraq on 27 February 1944, and damaged 6207-ton Ensis on 29 February. U-407 then sank 7210-ton Meyer London and damaged Liberty ship Thomas G. Masaryk of convoy UGS 37 on 16 April, and was sunk by destroyers off Salamis on 19 September 1944.
- U-410 sank Liberty ship Christian Michelsen of convoy UGS 17 on 26 September 1943. U-410 then sank Fort ship Fort Howe and damaged 3722-ton Empire Commerce of convoy MKS 26 on 1 October and sank Fort ship Fort Saint Nicolas on 15 February 1944, HMS Penelope on 18 February, and LST-348 on 20 February before being destroyed by an 11 March 1944 USAAF raid on Toulon.
- U-431 was sunk on 21 October 1943 by a Vickers Wellington of 179 Squadron.
- U-453 sank the 80-ton Aqia Paraskevi, the 67-ton Himli, and the 81-ton Salem on 1 February 1944 and the 64-ton Yahiya on 2 February. She then sank Fort ship Fort Missanabie of convoy HA 43 on 19 May and was hunted to exhaustion by convoy escorts on 21 May 1944.
- U-565 was scuttled at Salamis on 19 September 1944.
- U-593 sank Liberty ship William W. Gerhard of convoy NSS 3 on 21 September 1943, USS Skill on 25 September, 4531-ton Mont Viso of convoy KMS 30 on 3 November, and HMS Holcombe and HMS Tynedale of convoy KMS 34 with G7es torpedoes on 12 December while being hunted to exhaustion by the convoy escort on 13 December 1943.
- U-596 sank 5542-ton Marit of convoy XT 4 on 4 October and 8009-ton Cap Padaran of convoy HA 11 on 9 December 1943 before being scuttled at Salamis on 19 September 1944.
- U-616 sank USS Buck on 9 October 1943 and LCT-553 on 11 October, and damaged 7127-ton Fort ship Fort Fidler and 10,627-ton G.S. Walden of convoy GUS 39 with G7es torpedoes before being hunted to exhaustion by convoy escorts on 14 May 1944.
- U-617 was sunk on 11 September 1943 by Vickers Wellingtons of 179 Squadron.

=== Replacements ===
- U-223 passed Gibraltar on 26 September 1943, damaged 4970-ton Stanmore of convoy KMS 27 on 2 October, damaged HMS Cuckmere with a G7es torpedo on 11 December, and sank HMS Laforey with a G7es torpedo while being hunted to exhaustion on 29 March 1944.
- U-450 passed Gibraltar on 1 November 1943 and was sunk on 10 March 1944 by Royal Navy destroyers.
- U-642 passed Gibraltar on 3 November 1943 and was destroyed in Toulon by USAAF raids on 5 July and 6 August 1944.
- U-230 passed Gibraltar on 5 December 1943, sank LST-418 on 16 February 1944, LST-305 on 20 February, and PC-558 on 9 May before being scuttled at Toulon on 21 August 1944.
- U-952 passed Gibraltar on 3 January 1944, sank Liberty ship William B. Woods on 10 March and was destroyed in Toulon by USAAF raids on 5 July and 6 August 1944.
- U-343 passed Gibraltar on 5 January 1944 and was sunk on 10 March 1944 by the trawler Mull.
- U-455 passed Gibraltar on 22 January 1944 and was lost to unknown causes some time after 6 April 1944.
- U-969 passed Gibraltar on 3 February 1944, damaged Liberty ships George Cleeve and Peter Skene Ogden of convoy GUS 31 on 22 February, and was destroyed in Toulon by USAAF raids on 5 July and 6 August 1944.
- U-586 passed Gibraltar on 13 February 1944 and was destroyed in Toulon by USAAF raids on 5 July and 6 August 1944.
- U-967 passed Gibraltar on 12 February 1944, sank USS Fechteler with a G7es torpedo on 5 May, and was scuttled at Toulon on 11 August 1944.
- U-421 passed Gibraltar on 20 March 1944 and was destroyed by a 29 April 1944 USAAF raid on Toulon.
- U-466 passed Gibraltar on 22 March 1944 and was scuttled at Toulon on 19 August 1944.
- U-471 passed Gibraltar on 31 March 1944 and was destroyed in Toulon by USAAF raids on 5 July and 6 August 1944.
- U-960 passed Gibraltar on 30 April 1944 and was hunted to exhaustion on 19 May 1944.

== Success and failure ==
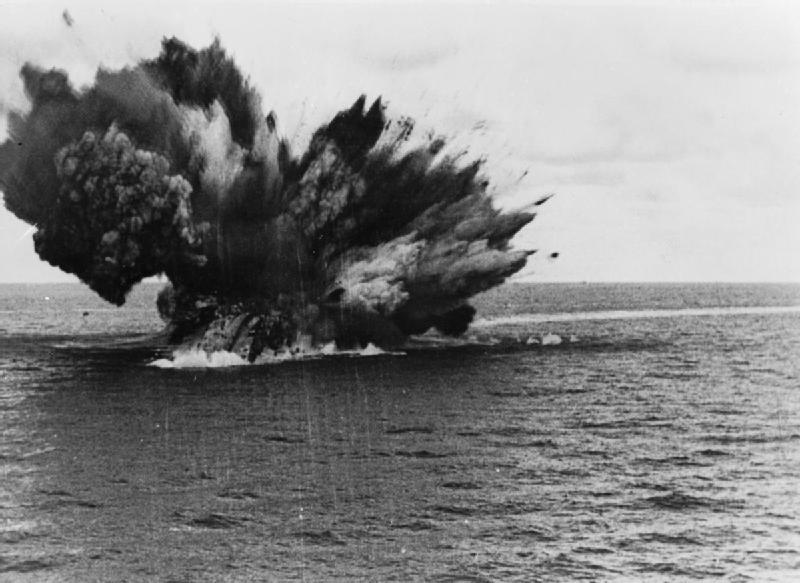
HMS Barham explodes as her 15-inch magazine ignites, 25 November 1941.

The Germans sank 95 Allied merchant ships totalling 449,206 tons and 24 Royal Navy warships including two carriers, one battleship, four cruisers and 12 destroyers at the cost of 62 U-boats. Noteworthy successes were the sinking of HMS Barham, Ark Royal, Eagle and Penelope.

=== U-boats sunk by Allied submarines ===
Four U-boats were sunk by Allied submarines in the Mediterranean:

- German submarine U-95 was sunk on 28 November 1941 in the western Mediterranean, south-west of Almería, in position 36.24°N 03.20°W by torpedoes from the Dutch submarine HrMs O 21. 35 crewmembers died and 12 survived.
- U-301 was sunk on 21 January 1943 in the Mediterranean, west of Bonifacio, in position 41.27°N 07.04°E by torpedoes from the British submarine HMS Sahib. 45 crewmembers died and 1 survived.
- U-303 was sunk on 21 May 1943 in the western Mediterranean south of Toulon, in position 42.50°N 06.00°E by torpedoes from the British submarine HMS Sickle. 20 crewmembers died and 28 survived.
- U-374 was sunk on 12 January 1942 in the western Mediterranean, east of Cape Spartivento, in position 37.50°N 16.00°E, by torpedoes from the British submarine HMS Unbeaten. Only one crewmember out of 45 survived.

== See also ==
- Military history of Gibraltar during World War II
- 29th U-boat Flotilla

== Bibliography ==
- Blair, Clay (1996). Hitler's U-Boat War: The Hunters 1939–1942. New York: Random House. ISBN 0-394-58839-8.
- Blair, Clay (1998). Hitler's U-Boat War: The Hunted 1942–1945. New York: Random House. ISBN 0-679-45742-9.
- Taylor, JC (1966). German Warships of World War II. New York: Doubleday & Company. ISBN 978-0711001541.
- Paterson, Lawrence (2007). U-Boats in the Mediterranean 1941–1944. London: Chatham Publishing. ISBN 978-1-86176-290-0.
