= German submarine U-301 =

German World War II submarine

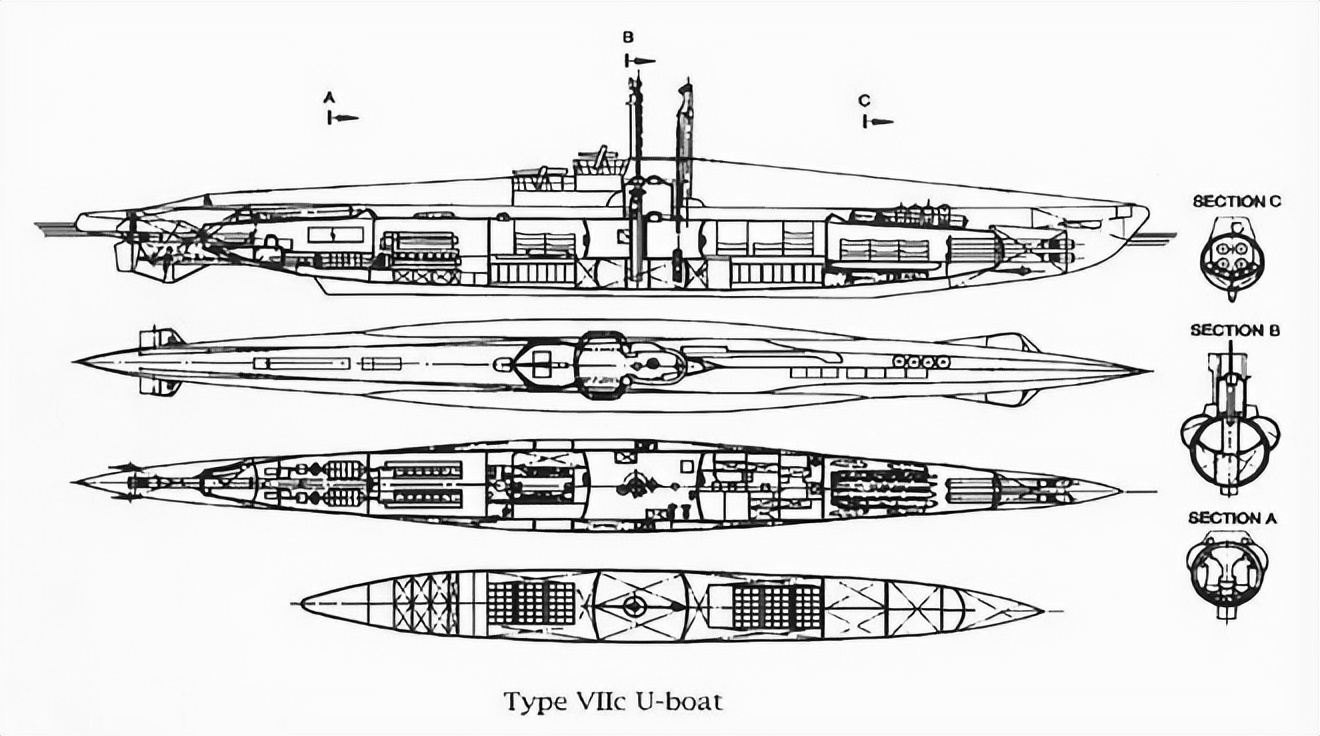
- Cross-section of a Type VIIC U-boat.

History

Nazi Germany
- Name: U-301
- Ordered: 6 August 1940
- Builder: Flender Werke
- Yard number: 301
- Laid down: 12 February 1941
- Launched: 25 March 1942
- Commissioned: 9 May 1942
- Fate: Sunk, 21 January 1943

General characteristics
- Class & type: Type VIIC submarine
- Displacement: 769 tonnes (757 long tons) surfaced; 871 t (857 long tons) submerged
- Length: 67.10 m (220 ft 2 in) o/a; 50.50 m (165 ft 8 in) pressure hull
- Beam: 6.20 m (20 ft 4 in) o/a; 4.70 m (15 ft 5 in) pressure hull
- Height: 9.60 m (31 ft 6 in)
- Draught: 4.74 m (15 ft 7 in)
- Installed power: 2,800–3,200 PS (2,100–2,400 kW; 2,800–3,200 bhp) (diesels); 750 PS (550 kW; 740 shp) (electric)
- Propulsion: 2 shafts; 2 × diesel engines; 2 × electric motors.
- Speed: 17.7 knots (32.8 km/h; 20.4 mph) surfaced; 7.6 knots (14.1 km/h; 8.7 mph) submerged
- Range: 8,500 nmi (15,700 km; 9,800 mi) at 10 knots (19 km/h; 12 mph) surfaced; 80 nmi (150 km; 92 mi) at 4 knots (7.4 km/h; 4.6 mph) submerged
- Test depth: 230 m (750 ft); Crush depth: 250–295 m (820–968 ft)
- Complement: 4 officers, 40–56 enlisted
- Armament: 5 × 53.3 cm (21 in) torpedo tubes (four bow, one stern); 14 × torpedoes or 26 TMA mines; 1 × 8.8 cm (3.46 in) deck gun (220 rounds); 1 x 2 cm (0.79 in) C/30 AA gun

Service record
- Part of: 5th U-boat Flotilla; 9 May – 30 September 1942; 1st U-boat Flotilla; 1 October – 31 December 1942; 29th U-boat Flotilla; 1 – 21 January 1943
- Identification codes: M 44 381
- Commanders: Kptlt. Willy-Roderich Körner; 9 May 1942 – 21 January 1943
- Operations: 3 patrols: 1st patrol: 1 October – 7 November 1942; 2nd patrol: 3 – 14 December 1942; 3rd patrol: 20 – 21 January 1943
- Victories: None

German submarine U-301 was a Type VIIC U-boat built for the German Navy (Kriegsmarine) during World War II. The submarine was laid down on 12 February 1941 at the Flender Werke yard at Lübeck, launched on 25 March 1942, and commissioned on 9 May 1942. During her short career the U-boat sailed on three combat patrols, without sinking or damaging any ships, before she was sunk on 21 January 1943 by a British submarine in the Mediterranean Sea.

== Design and description ==
German Type VIIC submarines were preceded by the shorter Type VIIB submarines. Type VIIC U-boats had a displacement of 769 tonnes (757 long tons) on the surface and 871 tonnes (857 long tons) while submerged. U-301 had a total length of 67.10 m (220 ft 2 in), a pressure hull length of 50.50 m (165 ft 8 in), a beam of 6.20 m (20 ft 4 in), a height of 9.60 m (31 ft 6 in), and a draught of 4.74 m (15 ft 7 in). U-301's power was produced by two Germaniawerft F46 supercharged six-cylinder, four-stroke diesel engines producing a total of 2,800 to 3,200 metric horsepower (2,060 to 2,350 kW; 2,760 to 3,160 shp) for use while surfaced, and two Garbe, Lahmeyer & Co. RP 137/c double-acting electric motors producing 750 metric horsepower (550 kW; 740 shp) total for use while submerged. The submarine had two shafts and two 1.23 m (4 ft) propellers. U-301 could submerge to up to 230 metres (750 ft) underwater.

U-301 had a maximum speed of 17.7 knots (32.8 km/h; 20.4 mph) while surfaced and a maximum speed of 7.6 knots (14.1 km/h; 8.7 mph) when submerged. The submarine had a range of 80 nautical miles (150 km; 92 mi) at 4 knots (7.4 km/h; 4.6 mph) while underwater; on the surface, she could travel 8,500 nautical miles (15,700 km; 9,800 mi) at 10 knots (19 km/h; 12 mph). U-301 was fitted with five 53.3 cm (21 in) torpedo tubes (four in the bow and one in the stern), fourteen torpedoes or 26 TMA mines, one 8.8 cm (3.46 in) SK C/35 naval gun with 220 rounds, and a 2 cm (0.79 in) C/30 anti-aircraft gun. The submarine had a complement of between 44 and 60 men.

== Construction and career ==
Ordered on 6 August 1940, U-301 was laid down on 12 February 1941 at the Flender Werke yard at Lübeck, Northern Germany. The submarine was launched on 25 March 1942, and commissioned on 9 May 1942 under the command of Oberleutnant zur See Willy-Roderich Körner.

Between 9 May 1942 and 30 September 1942, U-301 conducted training with the 5th U-boat Flotilla.

=== First patrol ===
After completing her training, U-301 was transferred to the 1st U-boat Flotilla based at Brest in France, for front-line service on 1 October 1942. On that day, U-301 departed Kiel and sailed out into the Atlantic Ocean, operating as part of wolfpack 'Panther' from 11 to 16 October, 'Puma' from 16 to 26, and 'Südwärts' from 24 to 26. U-301 attempted to attack the US-bound convoy ON 139 along with several U-boats on 23 and 24 October, but their attacks were repelled by the escorting ships. The submarine arrived in Brest on 7 November. U-301 did not sink any ship during this patrol.

=== Second patrol ===
U-301 sailed from Brest on 3 December 1942, then passed through the Strait of Gibraltar into the Mediterranean Sea and on to the U-boat base at La Spezia in northern Italy, arriving on 14 December. The patrol was also unsuccessful.

=== Third patrol ===
Transferred to the 29th U-boat Flotilla on 1 January 1943, U-301 sailed on her third and final patrol on 20 January. The next day at 8:48 in the morning, U-301 was sunk west of Bonifacio, Corsica, in position 41°27′N 07°04′E by torpedoes from the British submarine HMS Sahib. According to Sahib's log the U-boat was first spotted proceeding on the surface early that morning at a distance of 4.5 miles (7.2 km). Sahib then closed to 2.6 miles (4.2 km) and into a more favourable position before firing a full salvo of six torpedoes at five second intervals. Three minutes later three explosions were heard, a large cloud of smoke was seen and it was noted that radio transmissions stopped. Sahib closed and recovered the only survivor from the 46 crew, 19-year-old Wilhelm Rahn.

== See also ==
- Mediterranean U-boat Campaign (World War II)

== Bibliography ==
- Busch, Rainer; Röll, Hans-Joachim (1999). German U-boat commanders of World War II : a biographical dictionary. Translated by Brooks, Geoffrey. London, Annapolis: Greenhill Books, Naval Institute Press. ISBN 1-55750-186-6.
- Busch, Rainer; Röll, Hans-Joachim (1999). Der U-Boot-Krieg, 1939-1945: Deutsche U-Boot-Verluste von September 1939 bis Mai 1945 [German U-boat losses from September 1939 to May 1945] (in German). Vol. IV. Hamburg, Berlin, Bonn: Mittler. ISBN 3-8132-0514-2.
- Carruthers, Bob (2013). The U-Boat War in the Atlantic: Volume II: 1942-1943. Pen and Sword. ISBN 978-1-47384-663-0.
- Gröner, Erich; Jung, Dieter; Maass, Martin (1991). U-boats and Mine Warfare Vessels. German Warships 1815–1945. Vol. 2. Translated by Thomas, Keith; Magowan, Rachel. London: Conway Maritime Press. ISBN 0-85177-593-4.
- Fontenoy, Paul E. (2007). Submarines: An Illustrated History of Their Impact. ABC-CLIO Publishing. ISBN 978-1-85109-563-6.
- Heden, Karl Eric (2006). Sunken Ships, World War II: U.S. Naval Chronology Including Submarine Losses of the United States, England, Germany, Japan, Italy. History Reference Center: Branden Books. ISBN 0828321183.
- Kemp, Paul (1999). U-Boats Destroyed - German Submarine Losses in the World Wars. London: Arms & Armour. ISBN 1-85409-515-3.
- Niestle, Alex (2014). German U-Boat Losses During World War II: Details of Destruction. Frontline Books. ISBN 978-1-473838-29-1.
- Ross, David; Bishop, Chris (2016). Submarines: WWI to the Present. Book Sales. ISBN 978-0-785834-46-5.
