= German submarine U-343 =

German World War II submarine

History

Nazi Germany
- Name: U-343
- Ordered: 20 January 1941
- Builder: Nordseewerke, Emden
- Yard number: 215
- Laid down: 1 April 1942
- Launched: 21 December 1942
- Commissioned: 18 February 1943
- Fate: Sunk on 10 March 1944

General characteristics
- Class & type: Type VIIC submarine
- Displacement: 769 tonnes (757 long tons) surfaced; 871 t (857 long tons) submerged
- Length: 67.10 m (220 ft 2 in) o/a; 50.50 m (165 ft 8 in) pressure hull
- Beam: 6.20 m (20 ft 4 in) o/a; 4.70 m (15 ft 5 in) pressure hull
- Height: 9.60 m (31 ft 6 in)
- Draught: 4.74 m (15 ft 7 in)
- Installed power: 2,800–3,200 PS (2,100–2,400 kW; 2,800–3,200 bhp) (diesels); 750 PS (550 kW; 740 shp) (electric)
- Propulsion: 2 shafts; 2 × diesel engines; 2 × electric motors
- Speed: 17.7 knots (32.8 km/h; 20.4 mph) surfaced; 7.6 knots (14.1 km/h; 8.7 mph) submerged
- Range: 8,500 nmi (15,700 km; 9,800 mi) at 10 knots (19 km/h; 12 mph) surfaced; 80 nmi (150 km; 92 mi) at 4 knots (7.4 km/h; 4.6 mph) submerged
- Test depth: 230 m (750 ft); Crush depth: 250–295 m (820–968 ft)
- Complement: 4 officers, 40–56 enlisted
- Armament: 5 × 53.3 cm (21 in) torpedo tubes (four bow, one stern); 14 × torpedoes or 26 TMA mines; 1 × 8.8 cm (3.46 in) deck gun (220 rounds); 2 × twin 2 cm (0.79 in) C/30 anti-aircraft guns

Service record
- Part of: 8th U-boat Flotilla; 18 February – 31 October 1943; 3rd U-boat Flotilla; 1 November 1943 – 31 January 1944; 29th U-boat Flotilla; 1 February – 10 March 1944
- Identification codes: M 50 232
- Commanders: Oblt.z.S. Wolfgang Rahn; 18 February 1943 – 10 March 1944
- Operations: 3 patrols: 1st patrol: 22 October – 16 November 1943; 2nd patrol: 26 December 1943 – 19 January 1944; 3rd patrol: 4 – 10 March 1944
- Victories: 2 Wellington bombers shot down; 1 Wellington bomber damaged; 1 Catalina flying boat damaged

German submarine U-343 was a Type VIIC U-boat of Nazi Germany's Kriegsmarine during World War II. The submarine was laid down on 1 April 1942 at the Nordseewerke yard at Emden, launched on 21 December 1942 and commissioned on 18 February 1943 under the command of Leutnant zur See Wolfgang Rahn.

After training with the 8th U-boat Flotilla at Danzig, U-343 was transferred to the 3rd U-boat Flotilla, based at La Pallice in France, for front-line service on 1 November 1943, and then to the 29th U-boat Flotilla, based at Toulon on the Mediterranean coast, on 1 February 1944. On 10 March 1944, U-343 was sunk off Bizerte by depth charges from a British warship. All 51 of her crew members were lost with the U-boat.

== Construction and Design ==
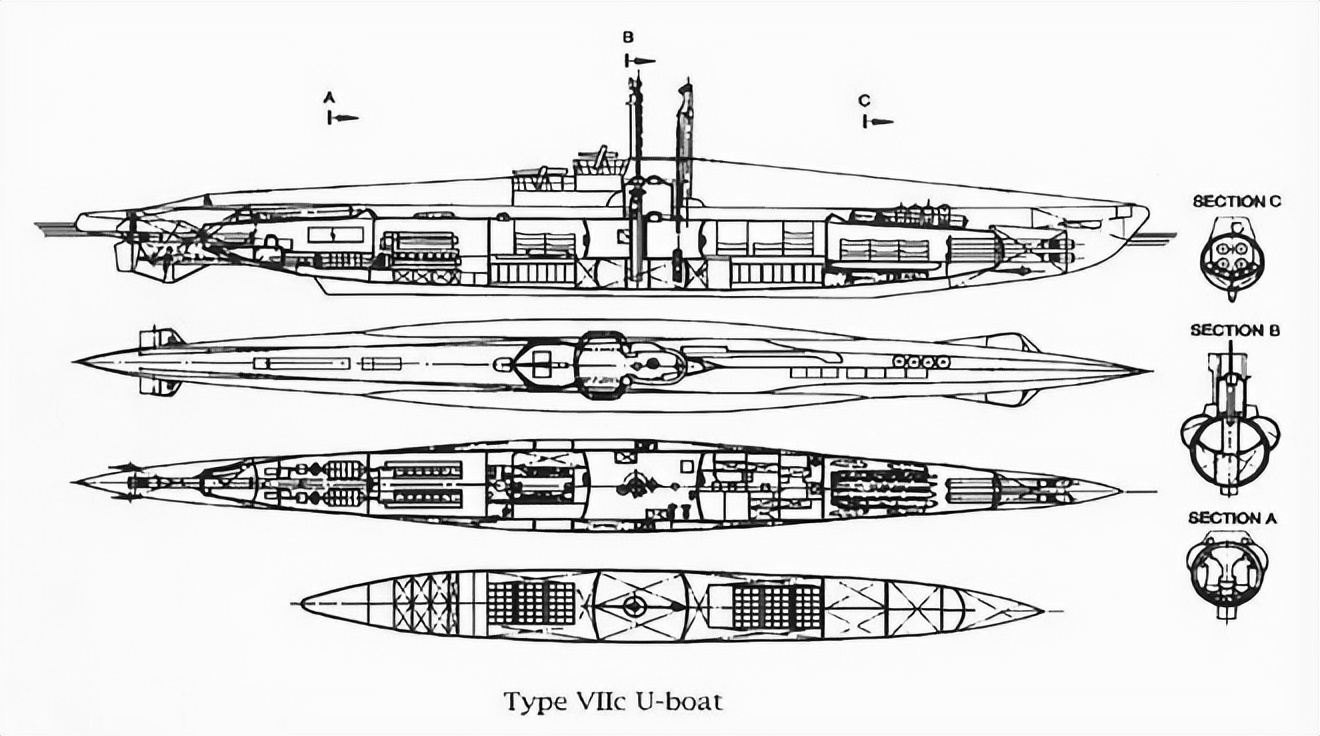
A cross-section of a Type VIIC submarine

U-343 was ordered by the Kriegsmarine on 21 November 1940. She was laid down about eight months later at the Nordseewerke yard at Emden, on 1 April 1942. Just under eight months later, U-343 was launched from Emden on 21 December 1942. She was formally commissioned the next year on 18 February 1943. U-343 carried five 53.3 cm (21 in) torpedo tubes (four located in the bow, one in the stern) and had one 8.8 cm (3.46 in) deck gun with 220 rounds. She could also carry 14 torpedoes or 26 TMA mines and had a crew of 44-52 men.

== Service history ==
=== First patrol ===
U-343 sailed from Kiel under the command of Oberleutnant zur See Wolfgang Rahn on 16 October 1943, stopping at Trondheim for three days before continuing out into the north Atlantic to join the "wolfpacks" 'Eisenhart 7' on 9 November and 'Schill 2' on 17 November. However, she made no successful attacks, before arriving at her new home port of La Pallice on 16 November after 26 days at sea.

=== Second patrol ===
U-343 left La Pallice on 26 December 1943, sailed around the coast of Spain and Portugal and into the Mediterranean Sea, passing through the Strait of Gibraltar on 5 January 1944.

At 20:30 on 7 January the U-boat was attacked by a Wellington bomber from No. 36 Squadron RAF. After dropping five depth charges, all of which missed, the plane was hit on the port wing by the U-boat's anti-aircraft fire and caught fire. The aircraft crashed into the sea, killing the pilot and navigator. The remaining four crewmen were rescued by the Free Polish destroyer ORP Ślązak the next day.

However, another Wellington of 36 Squadron arrived on the scene, and immediately attacked U-343. Its depth charges fell wide after the port engine was hit by the U-boat's AA fire, but it managed to reach Bône, Algeria, safely.

The next day, 8 January, at 21:40 a third Wellington of 36 Squadron located U-343 south-west of Cartagena, Spain, and brought two more Wellingtons from No. 179 Squadron RAF, based at Gibraltar, to attack. One aircraft dropped six depth charges, but was hit by AA fire on the port wing, which caught fire, and the aircraft crashed into the sea, killing five crewmen. Only the pilot survived, and was passed closely by the U-boat twice while in his dinghy. He was picked up by the destroyer HMS Active the next morning.

The attacks on the U-boat continued for several hours, and were augmented by the arrival of a Catalina flying boat from No. 202 Squadron RAF. It too was hit by AA fire, forcing the aircraft to head for home.

=== Third patrol ===
U-343 left Toulon on 4 March 1944 and headed for the coast of Tunisia. There on 10 March 1944, north of Bizerte, in position 38°07′N 09°41′E, she was sunk by depth charges from the British minesweeping trawler HMS Mull with the loss of all 51 hands.

== See also ==
- Mediterranean U-boat Campaign (World War II)

== Bibliography ==
- Busch, Rainer; Röll, Hans-Joachim (1999). German U-boat commanders of World War II : a biographical dictionary. Translated by Brooks, Geoffrey. London, Annapolis, Md: Greenhill Books, Naval Institute Press. ISBN 1-55750-186-6.
- Busch, Rainer; Röll, Hans-Joachim (1999). Deutsche U-Boot-Verluste von September 1939 bis Mai 1945 [German U-boat losses from September 1939 to May 1945]. Der U-Boot-Krieg (in German). Vol. IV. Hamburg, Berlin, Bonn: Mittler. ISBN 3-8132-0514-2.
- Gröner, Erich; Jung, Dieter; Maass, Martin (1991). U-boats and Mine Warfare Vessels. German Warships 1815–1945. Vol. 2. Translated by Thomas, Keith; Magowan, Rachel. London: Conway Maritime Press. ISBN 0-85177-593-4.
- Kemp, Paul (1999). U-Boats Destroyed - German Submarine Losses in the World Wars. London: Arms & Armour. ISBN 1-85409-515-3.
