= German submarine U-375 =

German World War II submarine

History

Nazi Germany
- Name: U-375
- Ordered: 16 October 1939
- Builder: Howaldtswerke, Kiel
- Yard number: 6
- Laid down: 14 March 1940
- Launched: 7 June 1941
- Commissioned: 19 July 1941
- Fate: Missing since 25 July 1943 in the Mediterranean Sea south of Sicily. No explanation for her loss.

General characteristics
- Class & type: Type VIIC submarine
- Displacement: 769 tonnes (757 long tons) surfaced; 871 t (857 long tons) submerged
- Length: 67.10 m (220 ft 2 in) o/a; 50.50 m (165 ft 8 in) pressure hull
- Beam: 6.20 m (20 ft 4 in) o/a; 4.70 m (15 ft 5 in) pressure hull
- Height: 9.60 m (31 ft 6 in)
- Draught: 4.74 m (15 ft 7 in)
- Installed power: 2,800–3,200 PS (2,100–2,400 kW; 2,800–3,200 bhp) (diesels); 750 PS (550 kW; 740 shp) (electric)
- Propulsion: 2 shafts; 2 × diesel engines; 2 × electric motors
- Speed: 17.7 knots (32.8 km/h; 20.4 mph) surfaced; 7.6 knots (14.1 km/h; 8.7 mph) submerged
- Range: 8,500 nmi (15,700 km; 9,800 mi) at 10 knots (19 km/h; 12 mph) surfaced; 80 nmi (150 km; 92 mi) at 4 knots (7.4 km/h; 4.6 mph) submerged
- Test depth: 230 m (750 ft); Crush depth: 250–295 m (820–968 ft)
- Complement: 4 officers, 40–56 enlisted
- Armament: 5 × 53.3 cm (21 in) torpedo tubes (four bow, one stern); 14 × torpedoes; 1 × 8.8 cm (3.46 in) deck gun (220 rounds); 1 x 2 cm (0.79 in) C/30 AA gun

Service record
- Part of: 5th U-boat Flotilla; 19 July – 31 October 1941; 3rd U-boat Flotilla; 1 November – 31 December 1941; 29th U-boat Flotilla; 1 January 1942 – 25 July 1943
- Identification codes: M 00 016
- Commanders: Kptlt. Jürgen Koenenkamp; 19 July 1941 – 25 July 1943
- Operations: 10 patrols: 1st patrol: 12 November – 26 December 1941; 2nd patrol: a. 17 – 19 January 1942; b. 25 January – 10 February 1942; 3rd patrol: 27 April – 6 May 1942; 4th patrol: 29 June – 3 August 1942; 5th patrol: 22 August – 29 September 1942; 6th patrol: 14 November – 23 December 1942; 7th patrol: 4 February – 2 March 1943; 8th patrol: 17 March – 19 April 1943; 9th patrol: 27 June – 7 July 1943; 10th patrol: 10 – 25 July 1943
- Victories: 8 merchant ships sunk (8,090 GRT); 1 merchant ship total loss (6,288 GRT); 1 warship damaged (2,650 tons)

German submarine U-375 was a Type VIIC U-boat built for Nazi Germany's Kriegsmarine for service during World War II. She was laid down on 14 March 1940 by Howaldtswerke in Kiel as yard number 6, launched on 7 June 1941 and commissioned on 19 July 1941 under Kapitänleutnant Jürgen Koenenkamp.

== Design ==
German Type VIIC submarines were preceded by the shorter Type VIIB submarines. U-375 had a displacement of 769 tonnes (757 long tons) when at the surface and 871 tonnes (857 long tons) while submerged. She had a total length of 67.10 m (220 ft 2 in), a pressure hull length of 50.50 m (165 ft 8 in), a beam of 6.20 m (20 ft 4 in), a height of 9.60 m (31 ft 6 in), and a draught of 4.74 m (15 ft 7 in). The submarine was powered by two Germaniawerft F46 four-stroke, six-cylinder supercharged diesel engines producing a total of 2,800 to 3,200 metric horsepower (2,060 to 2,350 kW; 2,760 to 3,160 shp) for use while surfaced, two Garbe, Lahmeyer & Co. RP 137/c double-acting electric motors producing a total of 750 metric horsepower (550 kW; 740 shp) for use while submerged. She had two shafts and two 1.23 m (4 ft) propellers. The boat was capable of operating at depths of up to 230 metres (750 ft).

The submarine had a maximum surface speed of 17.7 knots (32.8 km/h; 20.4 mph) and a maximum submerged speed of 7.6 knots (14.1 km/h; 8.7 mph). When submerged, the boat could operate for 80 nautical miles (150 km; 92 mi) at 4 knots (7.4 km/h; 4.6 mph); when surfaced, she could travel 8,500 nautical miles (15,700 km; 9,800 mi) at 10 knots (19 km/h; 12 mph). U-375 was fitted with five 53.3 cm (21 in) torpedo tubes (four fitted at the bow and one at the stern), fourteen torpedoes, one 8.8 cm (3.46 in) SK C/35 naval gun, 220 rounds, and a 2 cm (0.79 in) C/30 anti-aircraft gun. The boat had a complement of between forty-four and sixty.

== Service history ==
The boat's service began on 19 July 1941 with training as part of the 5th U-boat Flotilla. She was transferred to the 3rd Flotilla on 1 November 1941 for active service, followed by a transfer to 29th Flotilla on 1 January 1942 in the Mediterranean.

In 10 patrols she sank 8 merchant ships, for a total of 8,090 GRT, plus 1 warship damaged and another merchant ship written off as a total loss.

=== Fate ===
U-375 has been missing since 25 July 1943 in the Mediterranean Sea south of Sicily. All hands were lost.

=== Previously recorded fate ===
U-375 was thought to have been sunk after being depth charged by USN submarine chaser PC-624 on 30 July 1943 at position 36°40′N 12°28′E in the Mediterranean NW of Malta. All hands were lost. This attack was actually against Italian submarine Velella, inflicting no damage.

== Summary of raiding history ==
| Date | Ship Name | Nationality | Tonnage (Note: Merchant ship tonnages are in gross register tons. Military vessels are listed by tons displacement.) | Fate |
|---|---|---|---|---|
| 6 July 1942 | Hero | Norway | 1,376 | Sunk |
| 30 July 1942 | Amina | Egypt | 87 | Sunk |
| 30 July 1942 | Ikbal | Egypt | 176 | Sunk |
| 26 August 1942 | Empire Kumari | United Kingdom | 6,288 | Total loss |
| 3 September 1942 | Miriam | Mandatory Palestine | 38 | Sunk |
| 3 September 1942 | Arnon | Mandatory Palestine | 558 | Sunk |
| 3 September 1942 | Salina | Mandatory Palestine | 108 | Sunk |
| 6 September 1942 | Turkian | Egypt | 113 | Sunk |
| 1 December 1942 | HMS Manxman | Royal Navy | 2,650 | Damaged |
| 4 July 1943 | St.Essylt | United Kingdom | 5,634 | Sunk |

== See also ==
- Mediterranean U-boat Campaign (World War II)

== Bibliography ==
- Busch, Rainer; Röll, Hans-Joachim (1999). German U-boat commanders of World War II : a biographical dictionary. Translated by Brooks, Geoffrey. London, Annapolis, Md: Greenhill Books, Naval Institute Press. ISBN 1-55750-186-6.
- Busch, Rainer; Röll, Hans-Joachim (1999). Deutsche U-Boot-Verluste von September 1939 bis Mai 1945 [German U-boat losses from September 1939 to May 1945]. Der U-Boot-Krieg (in German). Vol. IV. Hamburg, Berlin, Bonn: Mittler. ISBN 3-8132-0514-2.
- Gröner, Erich; Jung, Dieter; Maass, Martin (1991). U-boats and Mine Warfare Vessels. German Warships 1815–1945. Vol. 2. Translated by Thomas, Keith; Magowan, Rachel. London: Conway Maritime Press. ISBN 0-85177-593-4.
- Sharpe, Peter (1998). U-Boat Fact File. Great Britain: Midland Publishing. ISBN 1-85780-072-9.
