= German submarine U-602 =

German World War II submarine

History

Nazi Germany
- Name: U-602
- Ordered: 22 May 1940
- Builder: Blohm & Voss, Hamburg
- Yard number: 578
- Laid down: 8 February 1941
- Launched: 30 October 1941
- Commissioned: 29 December 1941
- Fate: Missing since 19 April 1943 in the Mediterranean in position 36°50′N 00°00′W.

General characteristics
- Class & type: Type VIIC submarine
- Displacement: 769 tonnes (757 long tons) surfaced; 871 t (857 long tons) submerged
- Length: 67.10 m (220 ft 2 in) o/a; 50.50 m (165 ft 8 in) pressure hull
- Beam: 6.20 m (20 ft 4 in) o/a; 4.70 m (15 ft 5 in) pressure hull
- Draught: 4.74 m (15 ft 7 in)
- Installed power: 2,800–3,200 PS (2,100–2,400 kW; 2,800–3,200 bhp) (diesels); 750 PS (550 kW; 740 shp) (electric)
- Propulsion: 2 shafts; 2 × diesel engines; 2 × electric motors
- Speed: 17.7 knots (32.8 km/h; 20.4 mph) surfaced; 7.6 knots (14.1 km/h; 8.7 mph) submerged
- Range: 8,500 nmi (15,700 km; 9,800 mi) at 10 knots (19 km/h; 12 mph) surfaced; 80 nmi (150 km; 92 mi) at 4 knots (7.4 km/h; 4.6 mph) submerged
- Test depth: 230 m (750 ft); Crush depth: 250–295 m (820–968 ft)
- Complement: 4 officers, 40–56 enlisted
- Armament: 5 × 53.3 cm (21 in) torpedo tubes (four bow, one stern); 14 × torpedoes or 26 TMA mines; 1 × 8.8 cm (3.46 in) deck gun (220 rounds); 1 x 2 cm (0.79 in) C/30 AA gun

Service record
- Part of: 5th U-boat Flotilla; 29 December 1941 – 30 September 1942; 7th U-boat Flotilla; 1 October – 31 December 1942; 29th U-boat Flotilla; 1 January – 19 April 1943
- Identification codes: M 47 187
- Commanders: Oblt.z.S. / Kptlt. Philipp Schüler; 29 December 1941 – 19 April 1943
- Operations: 4 patrols: 1st patrol: 26 September - 6 November 1942; 2nd patrol: 1 – 21 December 1942; 3rd patrol: 6 February – 9 March 1943; 4th patrol: 6 – 19 April 1943
- Victories: 1 warship total loss (1,540 tons)

German submarine U-602 was a Type VIIC U-boat built for Nazi Germany's Kriegsmarine for service during World War II. She was laid down on 8 February 1941 by Blohm & Voss, Hamburg as yard number 578, launched on 30 October 1941 and commissioned on 29 December 1941 under Oberleutnant zur See Philipp Schüler.

== Design ==
German Type VIIC submarines were preceded by the shorter Type VIIB submarines. U-602 had a displacement of 769 tonnes (757 long tons) when at the surface and 871 tonnes (857 long tons) while submerged. She had a total length of 67.10 m (220 ft 2 in), a pressure hull length of 50.50 m (165 ft 8 in), a beam of 6.20 m (20 ft 4 in), a height of 9.60 m (31 ft 6 in), and a draught of 4.74 m (15 ft 7 in). The submarine was powered by two Germaniawerft F46 four-stroke, six-cylinder supercharged diesel engines producing a total of 2,800 to 3,200 metric horsepower (2,060 to 2,350 kW; 2,760 to 3,160 shp) for use while surfaced, two Brown, Boveri & Cie GG UB 720/8 double-acting electric motors producing a total of 750 metric horsepower (550 kW; 740 shp) for use while submerged. She had two shafts and two 1.23 m (4 ft) propellers. The boat was capable of operating at depths of up to 230 metres (750 ft).

The submarine had a maximum surface speed of 17.7 knots (32.8 km/h; 20.4 mph) and a maximum submerged speed of 7.6 knots (14.1 km/h; 8.7 mph). When submerged, the boat could operate for 80 nautical miles (150 km; 92 mi) at 4 knots (7.4 km/h; 4.6 mph); when surfaced, she could travel 8,500 nautical miles (15,700 km; 9,800 mi) at 10 knots (19 km/h; 12 mph). U-602 was fitted with five 53.3 cm (21 in) torpedo tubes (four fitted at the bow and one at the stern), fourteen torpedoes, one 8.8 cm (3.46 in) SK C/35 naval gun, 220 rounds, and a 2 cm (0.79 in) C/30 anti-aircraft gun. The boat had a complement of between forty-four and sixty.

== Service history ==
The boat's career began with training at 5th U-boat Flotilla on 29 December 1941, followed by active service on 1 October 1942 as part of the 7th Flotilla. She later transferred for operations in the Mediterranean with 29th Flotilla for the remainder of her service.

In four patrols she was credited with the total loss of one warship (1,540 tons).

=== Wolfpacks ===
U-602 took part in two wolfpacks, namely:

- Panther (6 – 16 October 1942)
- Puma (16 – 29 October 1942)

=== Fate ===
U-602 went missing in the Mediterranean. She left the Military port of Toulon on 11 April 1943, and sent the last radio message on 19 April 1943 at position 36°50′N 00°00′W. All hands were lost.

=== Previously recorded fate ===
U-602 was originally thought to have been sunk on April 23, 1943 at position 36°10′N 00°30′W by depth charges from a British Hudson aircraft of RAF 500/N. This attack was actually against U-453, inflicting no damage.

== Summary of raiding history ==
Date	Ship Name	Nationality	Tonnage (Note: Merchant ship tonnages are in gross register tons. Military vessels are listed by tons displacement.)	Fate
9 December 1942	HMS Porcupine	Royal Navy	1,540	Total loss

== See also ==
- Mediterranean U-boat Campaign (World War II)

== Bibliography ==
- Busch, Rainer; Röll, Hans-Joachim (1999). German U-boat commanders of World War II : a biographical dictionary. Translated by Brooks, Geoffrey. London, Annapolis, Md: Greenhill Books, Naval Institute Press. ISBN 1-55750-186-6.
- Busch, Rainer; Röll, Hans-Joachim (1999). Der U-Boot-Krieg, 1939-1945: Deutsche U-Boot-Verluste von September 1939 bis Mai 1945 [German U-boat losses from September 1939 to May 1945] (in German). Vol. IV. Hamburg, Berlin, Bonn: Mittler. ISBN 3-8132-0514-2.
- Gröner, Eric; Jung, Dieter; Maass, Martin (1991). German Warships 1815-1945: U-boats and Mine Warfare Vessels. Vol. 2. Translated by Thomas, Keith; Magowan, Rachel. London: Conway Maritime Press. ISBN 0-85177-593-4.
- Sharpe, Peter (1998). U-Boat Fact File. Great Britain: Midland Publishing. ISBN 1-85780-072-9.
