= German submarine U-586 =

German World War II submarine

History

Nazi Germany
- Name: U-586
- Ordered: 8 January 1940
- Builder: Blohm & Voss, Hamburg
- Yard number: 562
- Laid down: 1 October 1940
- Launched: 10 July 1941
- Commissioned: 4 September 1941
- Fate: Sunk in port near Toulon, France. She was bombed by USAAF B-24 Liberators (15th Air Force) on 5 July 1944 at position 43°07′N 05°55′E.

General characteristics
- Class & type: Type VIIC submarine
- Displacement: 769 tonnes (757 long tons) surfaced; 871 t (857 long tons) submerged
- Length: 67.10 m (220 ft 2 in) o/a; 50.50 m (165 ft 8 in) pressure hull
- Beam: 6.20 m (20 ft 4 in) o/a; 4.70 m (15 ft 5 in) pressure hull
- Height: 9.60 m (31 ft 6 in)
- Draught: 4.74 m (15 ft 7 in)
- Installed power: 2,800–3,200 PS (2,100–2,400 kW; 2,800–3,200 bhp) (diesels); 750 PS (550 kW; 740 shp) (electric)
- Propulsion: 2 shafts; 2 × diesel engines; 2 × electric motors
- Speed: 17.7 knots (32.8 km/h; 20.4 mph) surfaced; 7.6 knots (14.1 km/h; 8.7 mph) submerged
- Range: 8,500 nmi (15,700 km; 9,800 mi) at 10 knots (19 km/h; 12 mph) surfaced; 80 nmi (150 km; 92 mi) at 4 knots (7.4 km/h; 4.6 mph) submerged
- Test depth: 230 m (750 ft); Crush depth: 250–295 m (820–968 ft)
- Complement: 4 officers, 40–56 enlisted
- Armament: 5 × 53.3 cm (21 in) torpedo tubes (four bow, one stern); 14 × torpedoes or 26 TMA mines; 1 × 8.8 cm (3.46 in) deck gun (220 rounds); 1 x 2 cm (0.79 in) C/30 AA gun

Service record
- Part of: 6th U-boat Flotilla; 4 September 1941 – 30 June 1942; 11th U-boat Flotilla; 1 July 1942 – 31 May 1943; 13th U-boat Flotilla; 1 June – 30 September 1943; 6th U-boat Flotilla; 1 October 1943 – 29 February 1944; 29th U-boat Flotilla; 1 March – 5 July 1944
- Identification codes: M 05 723
- Commanders: Kptlt. Dietrich von der Esch; 4 September 1941 – 30 September 1943; Oblt.z.S. Hans Götze; 1 October 1943 – 5 July 1944
- Operations: 13 patrols: 1st patrol: a. 12 January – 12 February 1942; b. 16 – 19 February 1942; 2nd patrol: 14 – 22 March 1942; 3rd patrol: a. 10 May – 1 June 1942; b. 4 – 6 June 1942; 4th patrol: a. 25 July – 16 August 1942; b. 27 – 31 August 1942; c. 3 – 5 October 1942; 5th patrol: a. 11 – 12 October 1942; b. 13 October – 5 November 1942; 6th patrol: a. 18 November – 1 December 1942; b. 6 – 10 December 1942; c. 11 December 1942; d. 7 – 8 February 1943; e. 25 February – 1 March 1943; 7th patrol: a. 2 – 13 March 1943; b. 15 – 16 March 1943; 8th patrol: a. 29 March – 2 May 1943; b. 27 – 31 May 1943; 9th patrol: a. 5 June – 10 July 1943; b. 18 – 19 July 1943; 10th patrol: a. 21 – 31 July 1943; b. 3 – 4 August 1943; b. 6 – 7 August 1943; 11th patrol: 19 October – 3 December 1943; 12th patrol: 29 January – 22 February 1944; 13th patrol: 9 May – 21 June 1944
- Victories: 2 merchant ships sunk (12,716 GRT); 1 merchant ship damaged (9,057 GRT)

German submarine U-586 was a Type VIIC U-boat built for Nazi Germany's Kriegsmarine for service during World War II. She was laid down on 1 October 1940 by Blohm & Voss in Hamburg as yard number 562, launched on 10 July 1941 and commissioned on 4 September 1941 under Kapitänleutnant Dietrich von der Esch.

== Design ==
German Type VIIC submarines were preceded by the shorter Type VIIB submarines. U-586 had a displacement of 769 tonnes (757 long tons) when at the surface and 871 tonnes (857 long tons) while submerged. She had a total length of 67.10 m (220 ft 2 in), a pressure hull length of 50.50 m (165 ft 8 in), a beam of 6.20 m (20 ft 4 in), a height of 9.60 m (31 ft 6 in), and a draught of 4.74 m (15 ft 7 in). The submarine was powered by two Germaniawerft F46 four-stroke, six-cylinder supercharged diesel engines producing a total of 2,800 to 3,200 metric horsepower (2,060 to 2,350 kW; 2,760 to 3,160 shp) for use while surfaced, two Brown, Boveri & Cie GG UB 720/8 double-acting electric motors producing a total of 750 metric horsepower (550 kW; 740 shp) for use while submerged. She had two shafts and two 1.23 m (4 ft) propellers. The boat was capable of operating at depths of up to 230 metres (750 ft).

The submarine had a maximum surface speed of 17.7 knots (32.8 km/h; 20.4 mph) and a maximum submerged speed of 7.6 knots (14.1 km/h; 8.7 mph). When submerged, the boat could operate for 80 nautical miles (150 km; 92 mi) at 4 knots (7.4 km/h; 4.6 mph); when surfaced, she could travel 8,500 nautical miles (15,700 km; 9,800 mi) at 10 knots (19 km/h; 12 mph). U-586 was fitted with five 53.3 cm (21 in) torpedo tubes (four fitted at the bow and one at the stern), fourteen torpedoes, one 8.8 cm (3.46 in) SK C/35 naval gun, 220 rounds, and a 2 cm (0.79 in) C/30 anti-aircraft gun. The boat had a complement of between forty-four and sixty.

== Service history ==
The boat's service began on 4 September 1941 with training as part of the 6th U-boat Flotilla. She was transferred to the 11th U-boat Flotilla on 1 July 1942 and then to the 13th U-boat Flotilla on 1 June 1943. She returned to the 6th U-boat Flotilla a short while later on 1 October 1943, and then to her final assignment with 29th U-boat Flotilla in the Mediterranean.

In 13 patrols she sank two merchant ships for a total of 12,716 gross register tons (GRT), plus one merchant ship damaged.

=== Wolfpacks ===
She took part in ten wolfpacks, namely:

- Robbe (15 – 24 January 1942)
- Greif (14 – 29 May 1942)
- Nebelkönig (27 July – 14 August 1942)
- Boreas (19 – 26 November 1942)
- Taifun (2 – 4 April 1943)
- Jahn (31 October – 2 November 1943)
- Tirpitz 3 (2 – 8 November 1943)
- Eisenhart 5 (9 – 15 November 1943)
- Schill 2 (17 – 22 November 1943)
- Weddigen (22 – 25 November 1943)

=== Fate ===
She was sunk whilst alongside at Missiessy East Quay, Toulon, France, by a USAAF air raid by B-24 Liberator bombers of 15th Air Force on 5 July 1944.

== Summary of raiding history ==
| Date | Ship Name | Nationality | Tonnage (GRT) | Fate |
|---|---|---|---|---|
| 9 February 1942 | Anna Knudsen | Norway | 9,057 | Damaged |
| 2 November 1942 | Empire Gilbert | United Kingdom | 6,640 | Sunk |
| 9 March 1943 | Puerto Rican | United States | 6,076 | Sunk |

== See also ==
- Mediterranean U-boat Campaign (World War II)

== Bibliography ==
- Busch, Rainer; Röll, Hans-Joachim (1999). German U-boat commanders of World War II : a biographical dictionary. Translated by Brooks, Geoffrey. London, Annapolis, Md: Greenhill Books, Naval Institute Press. ISBN 1-55750-186-6.
- Busch, Rainer; Röll, Hans-Joachim (1999). Der U-Boot-Krieg, 1939-1945: Deutsche U-Boot-Verluste von September 1939 bis Mai 1945 [German U-boat losses from September 1939 to May 1945] (in German). Vol. IV. Hamburg, Berlin, Bonn: Mittler. ISBN 3-8132-0514-2.
- Gröner, Eric; Jung, Dieter; Maass, Martin (1991). German Warships 1815-1945: U-boats and Mine Warfare Vessels. Vol. 2. Translated by Thomas, Keith; Magowan, Rachel. London: Conway Maritime Press. ISBN 0-85177-593-4.
