= German submarine U-303 =

German World War II submarine

History

Nazi Germany
- Name: U-303
- Ordered: 7 December 1940
- Builder: Flender Werke, Lübeck
- Yard number: 303
- Laid down: 14 June 1941
- Launched: 16 May 1942
- Commissioned: 7 July 1942
- Fate: Torpedoed and sunk, 21 May 1943

General characteristics
- Class & type: Type VIIC submarine
- Displacement: 769 tonnes (757 long tons) surfaced; 871 t (857 long tons) submerged
- Length: 67.10 m (220 ft 2 in) o/a; 50.50 m (165 ft 8 in) pressure hull
- Beam: 6.20 m (20 ft 4 in) o/a; 4.70 m (15 ft 5 in) pressure hull
- Height: 9.60 m (31 ft 6 in)
- Draught: 4.74 m (15 ft 7 in)
- Installed power: 2,800–3,200 PS (2,100–2,400 kW; 2,800–3,200 bhp) (diesels); 750 PS (550 kW; 740 shp) (electric)
- Propulsion: 2 shafts; 2 × diesel engines; 2 × electric motors.
- Speed: 17.7 knots (32.8 km/h; 20.4 mph) surfaced; 7.6 knots (14.1 km/h; 8.7 mph) submerged
- Range: 8,500 nmi (15,700 km; 9,800 mi) at 10 knots (19 km/h; 12 mph) surfaced; 80 nmi (150 km; 92 mi) at 4 knots (7.4 km/h; 4.6 mph) submerged
- Test depth: 230 m (750 ft); Crush depth: 250–295 m (820–968 ft)
- Complement: 4 officers, 40–56 enlisted
- Armament: 5 × 53.3 cm (21 in) torpedo tubes (four bow, one stern); 14 × torpedoes or 26 TMA mines; 1 × 8.8 cm (3.46 in) deck gun (220 rounds); 2 × twin 2 cm (0.79 in) C/30 anti-aircraft guns

Service record
- Part of: 8th U-boat Flotilla; 7 July – 31 December 1942; 7th U-boat Flotilla; 1 January – 31 March 1943; 29th U-boat Flotilla; 1 April – 21 May 1943
- Identification codes: M 05 973
- Commanders: Kptlt. Karl-Franz Heine; 7 July 1942 – 21 May 1943
- Operations: 2 patrols: 1st patrol: 31 December 1942 – 8 March 1943; 2nd patrol: a. 1 – 15 April 1943; b. 23 – 24 April 1943; c. 21 May 1943
- Victories: 1 merchant shup sunk (4,959 GRT)

German submarine U-303 was a Type VIIC U-boat of Nazi Germany's Kriegsmarine during World War II. She saw service in the Atlantic Ocean and Mediterranean Sea, and sank one freighter of 4,959 GRT in her two short and uneventful war patrols. Built in 1941 and 1942 at Lübeck, U-303 was a Type VIIC U-boat, capable of lengthy ocean patrols and of operating in distant environments.

== Design ==
German Type VIIC submarines were preceded by the shorter Type VIIB submarines. U-303 had a displacement of 769 tonnes (757 long tons) when at the surface and 871 tonnes (857 long tons) while submerged. She had a total length of 67.10 m (220 ft 2 in), a pressure hull length of 50.50 m (165 ft 8 in), a beam of 6.20 m (20 ft 4 in), a height of 9.60 m (31 ft 6 in), and a draught of 4.74 m (15 ft 7 in). The submarine was powered by two Germaniawerft F46 four-stroke, six-cylinder supercharged diesel engines producing a total of 2,800 to 3,200 metric horsepower (2,060 to 2,350 kW; 2,760 to 3,160 shp) for use while surfaced, two Garbe, Lahmeyer & Co. RP 137/c double-acting electric motors producing a total of 750 metric horsepower (550 kW; 740 shp) for use while submerged. She had two shafts and two 1.23 m (4 ft) propellers. The boat was capable of operating at depths of up to 230 metres (750 ft).

The submarine had a maximum surface speed of 17.7 knots (32.8 km/h; 20.4 mph) and a maximum submerged speed of 7.6 knots (14.1 km/h; 8.7 mph). When submerged, the boat could operate for 80 nautical miles (150 km; 92 mi) at 4 knots (7.4 km/h; 4.6 mph); when surfaced, she could travel 8,500 nautical miles (15,700 km; 9,800 mi) at 10 knots (19 km/h; 12 mph). U-303 was fitted with five 53.3 cm (21 in) torpedo tubes (four fitted at the bow and one at the stern), fourteen torpedoes, one 8.8 cm (3.46 in) SK C/35 naval gun, 220 rounds, and two twin 2 cm (0.79 in) C/30 anti-aircraft guns. The boat had a complement of between forty-four and sixty.

== Service history ==
=== First patrol ===
U-303 departed Kiel under the command of Kapitänleutnant Karl-Franz Heine on New Year's Day 1942, arriving at Lorient in France after a two and a half month passage. The spring of 1943 was the turning point for the Battle of the Atlantic, targets were getting harder to come by for German units. U-303 was no exception, managing to sink only one ship, the 4,959 GRT American vessel SS Expositor, on 23 February (which had been already crippled by U-606 and abandoned)

=== Second patrol and loss ===
Her second patrol was uneventful and very brief, simply a fourteen-day journey between Lorient and La Spezia in Italy, although it did involve passing through the heavily defended Strait of Gibraltar. She was to join a new flotilla operating in the Mediterranean Sea.

From La Spezia U-303 moved to Toulon in occupied France, from where she was to operate against British shipping aiding in operations following the evacuation of Tunisia. On her first attempt to do this, on 21 May 1943, she exited Toulon harbour on the surface and ran straight into the British submarine Sickle (P224), which torpedoed the U-boat before escaping. U-303 began to settle and list, and Heine ordered an immediate evacuation into life rafts which eventually carried the surviving crew to the French coast ten miles away. Ten sailors were less lucky, having been killed in the torpedo impact, and went down with their U-boat in position 42°50′N 06°00′E.

== Summary of raiding history ==
Date	Ship	Nationality	Tonnage (GRT)	Fate
23 February 1943	Expositor	United States	4,959	Sunk

== Bibliography ==
- Busch, Rainer; Röll, Hans-Joachim (1999). German U-boat commanders of World War II : a biographical dictionary. Translated by Brooks, Geoffrey. London, Annapolis, Md: Greenhill Books, Naval Institute Press. ISBN 1-55750-186-6.
- Busch, Rainer; Röll, Hans-Joachim (1999). Der U-Boot-Krieg, 1939-1945: Deutsche U-Boot-Verluste von September 1939 bis Mai 1945 [German U-boat losses from September 1939 to May 1945] (in German). Vol. IV. Hamburg, Berlin, Bonn: Mittler. ISBN 3-8132-0514-2.
- Edwards, Bernard (1996). Dönitz and the Wolf Packs - The U-boats at War. Cassell Military Classics. p. 158. ISBN 0-304-35203-9.
- Gröner, Erich; Jung, Dieter; Maass, Martin (1991). U-boats and Mine Warfare Vessels. German Warships 1815–1945. Vol. 2. Translated by Thomas, Keith; Magowan, Rachel. London: Conway Maritime Press. ISBN 0-85177-593-4.
- Kemp, Paul (1999). U-Boats Destroyed - German Submarine Losses in the World Wars. London: Arms & Armour. ISBN 1-85409-515-3.
- Sharpe, Peter (1998). U-Boat Fact File. Great Britain: Midland Publishing. ISBN 1-85780-072-9.
