= 29th U-boat Flotilla =

29. Unterseebootsflottille
- Active: Raised 1941, Dissolved 1944
- Country: Nazi Germany
- Branch: Kriegsmarine
- Type: U-boat flotilla
- Garrison/HQ: La Spezia

Commanders
- Notable commanders: Korvettenkapitän Fritz Frauenheim, Korvettenkapitän Gunter Jahn

29th U-boat Flotilla ("29. Unterseebootsflottille") was formed in December 1941 in La Spezia in Italy under the command of Korvettenkapitän Franz Becker. The flotilla operated mostly various marks of the Type VII U-boat and it concentrated its efforts mainly in the Mediterranean Sea, against convoys. In August 1943, the flotilla moved to Toulon, but did also have U-boats in Marseille and Salamis. The flotilla was disbanded in September 1944, when U-407 was sunk on September 19 and the two last flotilla boats U-565 and U-596 were scuttled in Salamis.

== Flotilla commanders ==
Duration	Commander
December 1941 – May 1942	Korvettenkapitän Franz Becker
May 1942 – July 1943	Korvettenkapitän Fritz Frauenheim
August 1943 – September 1944	Korvettenkapitän Gunter Jahn

== U-boats assigned to the flotilla ==
U-73	U-74	U-77	U-81	U-83	U-97	U-205
U-223	U-230	U-301	U-303	U-331	U-343	U-371
U-372	U-374	U-375	U-380	U-407	U-409	U-410
U-414	U-421	U-431	U-443	U-450	U-453	U-455
U-458	U-466	U-471	U-557	U-559	U-562	U-565
U-568	U-573	U-577	U-586	U-593	U-596	U-602
U-605	U-616	U-617	U-642	U-652	U-660	U-755
U-952	U-967	U-969				
