= SS Empire Eve =

World War II merchant ship of the United Kingdom

History
- Name: Empire Eve
- Owner: Ministry of War Transport
- Operator: J A Billmeir & Co Ltd (1941– ); Headlam & Sons Ltd ( –1943)
- Port of registry: Sunderland, United Kingdom
- Builder: William Pickersgill & Sons Ltd
- Launched: 26 April 1941
- Completed: June 1941
- Out of service: 18 May 1943
- Identification: United Kingdom Official Number 168912; Code Letters BCLM (1945–46)
- Fate: Torpedoed and sunk, 18 May 1943

General characteristics
- Class & type: CAM ship
- Tonnage: 5,979 GRT; 3,588 NRT
- Length: 401 ft 0 in (122.22 m)
- Beam: 54 ft 0 in (16.46 m)
- Depth: 33 ft 2 in (10.11 m)
- Installed power: 292 nhp
- Propulsion: Triple expansion steam engine
- Crew: 61, + 10 DEMS gunners (4 Army, 6 Navy), 1 Torpedo man (for catapult maintenance), 1 Radar mechanic, 6 Radar operators, 1 Naval aircraft directing officer, 7 RAF personnel
- Armament: 1 x Sea Hurricane, 1 x 40mm Bofors gun later replaced by 12-pounder anti-aircraft gun, 4 x 19mm Onlikon guns, bank of upward projecing rockets (UPs), Parachute floating aerial mines (FAMs)

Location where Empire Eve was torpedoed and sunk off Algeria.

Empire Eve was a 5,979 GRT CAM ship that was built in 1941 by William Pickersgill & Sons Ltd, Sunderland, Co Durham, United Kingdom for the Ministry of War Transport (MoWT). She served until 1943, when she was torpedoed and sunk by U-414 off Algeria.

== Description ==
The ship was built in 1941 by William Pickersgill & Sons Ltd, Sunderland, Co Durham.

The ship was 401 feet 0 inches (122.22 m) long, with a beam of 54 feet 0 inches (16.46 m). She had a depth of 30 feet 2 inches (9.19 m). She was assessed at 5,970 GRT, 388 NRT.

The ship was propelled by a 292 nhp triple expansion steam engine, which had cylinders of 23 1/2 inches (60 cm), 38 inches (97 cm) and 66 inches (170 cm) diameter by 45 inches (110 cm) stroke. The engine was built by George Clark (1938) Ltd, Sunderland.

== History ==
Empire Eve was launched on 26 April 1941 and completed in June. She was placed under the management of J A Billmeir & Co Ltd. Her port of registry was Sunderland. The United Kingdom Official Number 168912 and Code Letters BCLM were allocated. Management would later be transferred to Headlam & Sons Ltd, Whitby, Yorkshire.

Empire Eve was towed from Sunderland to the Tyne on 12 July 1941. She departed on 14 July to join Convoy EC 45, which had departed from Southend, Essex on 13 July and arrived at the Clyde on 18 July. She put into Methil, Fife on 16 July, departing the next day to join Convoy EC 46, which had departed from Southend on 15 July and arrived at the Clyde on 20 July. Empire Eve sailed on 27 July to join Convoy ON 1, which had departed from Liverpool, Lancashire the previous day and dispersed at 42°29′N 45°54′W on 9 August. She was bound for Halifax, Nova Scotia, Canada, where she arrived on 12 August. Laden with a cargo of grain, she departed with Convoy HX 146 on 21 August. Her Hawker Sea Hurricane was carrying the Squadron Code NJ-V. The convoy arrived at Liverpool on 6 September. She left the convoy at the Clyde, arriving on 7 September.

Empire Eve sailed on 19 September to join Convoy ON 18, which had departed from Liverpool that day and dispersed at 45°25′N 50°25′W on 2 October. She was bound for Halifax, where she arrived on 5 October. She departed the next day for Saint John, New Brunswick, arriving on 7 October and sailing four days later for Halifax, where she arrived on 12 October. Empire Eve was a member of Convoy HX 155, which departed on 16 October and arrived at Liverpool on 31 October. She was carrying a cargo of grain, and left the convoy at the Belfast Lough on 30 October.

Empire Eve then sailed to Liverpool, from where she departed on 15 November as a member of Convoy ON 37, which dispersed at 59°10′N 20°00′W on 30 November. Her destination was Halifax, where she arrived on 5 December. Laden with a cargo of grain, she returned with Convoy HX 165, which departed on 15 December and arrived at Liverpool on 30 December. She left the convoy at the Clyde, arriving on 28 December.

Empire Eve then sailed to Liverpool, She was a member of Convoy ON 56, which departed on 12 January 1942 and dispersed at 59°00′N 17°00′W on 16 January. She was bound for Halifax, arriving on 28 January. She departed the next day for Philadelphia, Pennsylvania, arriving on 1 February. Empire Eve sailed on 7 February for Halifax, where she arrived on 11 February. She was a member of Convoy HX 175, which departed on 13 February and arrived at Liverpool on 25 February. She was carrying a cargo of grain but was not carrying an aircraft.

Empire Eve departed on 17 March as a member of Convoy OG 81, which arrived at Gibraltar on 29 March. She left the convoy and put into the Clyde, arriving on 18 March. She sailed on 8 April to join Convoy OG 82, which had departed from Liverpool that day and arrived at Gibraltar on 20 April. She departed on 12 May to make a round trip to Melilla, Spain, returning on 15 May. Empire Eve was a member of Convoy HG 83, which departed on 22 May and arrived at Liverpool on 3 June. She was carrying a cargo of iron ore bound for Glasgow, Renfrewshire. She arrived at the Clyde on 2 June. She then spent 6 weeks being fitted out for an Arctic convoy to Russia. However, due to the heavy losses suffered by another convoy under enemy action, this convoy was cancelled after loading had commenced. The Empire Eve never went to Russia.

Empire Eve sailed on 25 July to join Convoy ON 116, which had departed from Liverpool that day and dispersed off Boston, Massachusetts on 12 August. Sailing in ballast, without her Hurricane or operational radar, her destination was Sydney, Cape Breton, Nova Scotia, which was reached by leaving the convoy and sailing to Halifax, where she arrived on 10 August, and then joining Convoy HS 40, which departed on 11 August and arrived at Sydney on 13 August. She sailed the next day with Convoy SQ 28, which arrived at Father Point, Quebec on 17 August. Empire Eve returned to Sydney with Convoy QS 30, which departed on 26 August and arrived on 30 August. She sailed on 30 August to join Convoy SC 98, which had departed from Halifax the previous day and arrived at Liverpool on 13 September. She was carrying a cargo of grain and lorries bound for Manchester, Lancashire. and had a deck cargo of 4 Sherman tanks and 8 crated Mustang fighters.

Empire Eve was a member of Convoy ON 134, which departed from Liverpool on 26 September and arrived at New York, United States on 17 October. Her captain was the convoy's Vice Commodore. She was bound for Halifax, where she arrived on 14 October. A round trip was made to Saint John via convoys HF 8 and FH 11, arriving back at Halifax on 30 October. Empire Eve sailed on 4 November to join Convoy SC 108, which had departed from New York on 1 November and arrived at Liverpool on 19 November. Her cargo consisted flour and grain. She left the convoy at the Clyde on 18 November.

Empire Eve sailed to Liverpool and joined Convoy ON 150, which departed on 1 December and arrived at New York on 25 December. She was bound for Halifax, arriving on 22 December. She departed on 25 December to make a round trip to Saint John, returning to Halifax (loaded with wheat) on 7 January 1943. Empire Eve sailed on 15 January to join Convoy SC 117, which had departed from New York on 12 January and arrived at Liverpool on 3 February. She was carrying general cargo and grain. She arrived at the Clyde on 2 February.

Empire Eve sailed on 22 February to join Convoy ON.169, which departed from Liverpool that day and arrived at New York on 21 March. She was bound for Halifax, where she arrived on 17 March. Laden with a cargo of grain, she departed on 31 March as a member of Convoy SC 125, which arrived at Liverpool on 15 April. She left the convoy at the Belfast Lough on 14 April, joining Convoy BB 279, which sailed that day and arrived at Milford Haven, Pembrokeshire the next day. She sailed on 20 April for Cardiff, Glamorgan, arriving later that day, where she was loaded with coal and returned to fully operational status with a Hurricane fighter and full radar crew.

Empire Eve sailed on 3 May for Milford Haven, arriving the next day. She sailed immediately to join Convoy OS47 km, which departed from Liverpool on 5 May and split at sea on 16 May to form convoys OS 47 and KMS 14. Convoy OS 47 arrived at Freetown, Sierra Leone on 25 May. KMS 14 arrived at Gibraltar on 17 May. Empire Eve was armed with a 4-inch or 4.7-inch gun, a 12-pounder gun, four Bofors guns and a number of kites. She was carrying a cargo of 6,500 long tons (6,600 t) of coal and 150 long tons (150 t) of lubricating oil. She then joined Convoy KMS 14, which departed on 17 May and arrived at Bône, Algeria on 21 May. On 18 May, Empire Eve was torpedoed and sunk by U-414 north east of Mostaganem, Algeria (36°37′N 00°46′E) (7 days later, U414 was herself sunk with the loss of all 41 crew). Empire Eve was crewed by 61 Merchant Navy sailors and 26 Service personnel coming from all 3 Services. Five crew were killed, all Merchant Navy. The survivors were rescued by HMS Barfoil and a LCT. They were landed at Algiers. Those killed serving on Empire Eve are commemorated on the Tower Hill Memorial, London.
