= German submarine U-421 =

German type VII C world war II submarine

History

Nazi Germany
- Name: U-421
- Ordered: 10 April 1941
- Builder: Danziger Werft, Danzig
- Yard number: 122
- Laid down: 20 January 1942
- Launched: 24 September 1942
- Commissioned: 13 January 1943
- Fate: Sunk on 29 April 1944 in the Mediterranean in position 43°07′N 05°55′E in an air raid by US aircraft.

General characteristics
- Class & type: Type VIIC submarine
- Displacement: 769 tonnes (757 long tons) surfaced; 871 t (857 long tons) submerged
- Length: 67.10 m (220 ft 2 in) o/a; 50.50 m (165 ft 8 in) pressure hull
- Beam: 6.20 m (20 ft 4 in) o/a; 4.70 m (15 ft 5 in) pressure hull
- Draught: 4.74 m (15 ft 7 in)
- Installed power: 2,800–3,200 PS (2,100–2,400 kW; 2,800–3,200 bhp) (diesels); 750 PS (550 kW; 740 shp) (electric)
- Propulsion: 2 shafts; 2 × diesel engines; 2 × electric motors
- Speed: 17.7 knots (32.8 km/h; 20.4 mph) surfaced; 7.6 knots (14.1 km/h; 8.7 mph) submerged
- Range: 8,500 nmi (15,700 km; 9,800 mi) at 10 knots (19 km/h; 12 mph) surfaced; 80 nmi (150 km; 92 mi) at 4 knots (7.4 km/h; 4.6 mph) submerged
- Test depth: 230 m (750 ft); Crush depth: 250–295 m (820–968 ft)
- Complement: 4 officers, 40–56 enlisted
- Armament: 5 × torpedo tubes (four bow, one stern); 14 × 53.3 cm (21 in) torpedoes; 1 × 8.8 cm (3.5 in) SK L/45 deck gun (220 rounds); various anti-aircraft guns

Service record
- Part of: 8th U-boat Flotilla; 13 January – 31 October 1943; 9th U-boat Flotilla; 1 November 1943 – 31 March 1944; 29th U-boat Flotilla; 1 – 29 April 1944
- Identification codes: M 49 743
- Commanders: Oblt.z.S. Hans Kolbus; 13 January 1943 – 29 April 1944
- Operations: 2 patrols: 1st patrol: 6 November 1943 – 8 January 1944; 2nd patrol: 19 February – 1 April 1944
- Victories: None

German submarine U-421 was a Type VIIC U-boat built for Nazi Germany's Kriegsmarine for service during World War II. She was laid down on 20 January 1942 by Danziger Werft, Danzig as yard number 122, launched on 24 September 1942 and commissioned on 13 January 1943 under Oberleutnant zur See Hans Kolbus.

== Design ==
German Type VIIC submarines were preceded by the shorter Type VIIB submarines. U-421 had a displacement of 769 tonnes (757 long tons) when at the surface and 871 tonnes (857 long tons) while submerged. She had a total length of 67.10 m (220 ft 2 in), a pressure hull length of 50.50 m (165 ft 8 in), a beam of 6.20 m (20 ft 4 in), a height of 9.60 m (31 ft 6 in), and a draught of 4.74 m (15 ft 7 in). The submarine was powered by two Germaniawerft F46 four-stroke, six-cylinder supercharged diesel engines producing a total of 2,800 to 3,200 metric horsepower (2,060 to 2,350 kW; 2,760 to 3,160 shp) for use while surfaced, two Siemens-Schuckert GU 343/38-8 double-acting electric motors producing a total of 750 metric horsepower (550 kW; 740 shp) for use while submerged. She had two shafts and two 1.23 m (4 ft) propellers. The boat was capable of operating at depths of up to 230 metres (750 ft).

The submarine had a maximum surface speed of 17.7 knots (32.8 km/h; 20.4 mph) and a maximum submerged speed of 7.6 knots (14.1 km/h; 8.7 mph). When submerged, the boat could operate for 80 nautical miles (150 km; 92 mi) at 4 knots (7.4 km/h; 4.6 mph); when surfaced, she could travel 8,500 nautical miles (15,700 km; 9,800 mi) at 10 knots (19 km/h; 12 mph). U-421 was fitted with five 53.3 cm (21 in) torpedo tubes (four fitted at the bow and one at the stern), fourteen torpedoes, one 8.8 cm (3.46 in) SK C/35 naval gun, 220 rounds, and two twin 2 cm (0.79 in) C/30 anti-aircraft guns. The boat had a complement of between forty-four and sixty.

== Service history ==
The boat's career began with training at 8th U-boat Flotilla on 13 January 1943, followed by active service on 1 November 1943 as part of the 9th Flotilla. On 1 April 1944, she transferred to 29th Flotilla for operations in the Mediterranean for the remainder of her service. In two patrols she sank no ships.

=== Wolfpacks ===
U-421 took part in six wolfpacks, namely:

- Coronel (4 – 8 December 1943)
- Coronel 1 (8 – 14 December 1943)
- Coronel 2 (14 – 17 December 1943)
- Föhr (18 – 23 December 1943)
- Rügen 6 (23 – 26 December 1943)
- Hela (28 December 1943 – 1 January 1944)

=== Fate ===
U-421 was sunk on 29 April 1944 in the Mediterranean in position 43°07′N 05°55′E at the military port of Toulon, France, in an air raid by US aircraft.

== See also ==
- Mediterranean U-boat Campaign (World War II)

== Bibliography ==
- Busch, Rainer; Röll, Hans-Joachim (1999). German U-boat commanders of World War II : a biographical dictionary. Translated by Brooks, Geoffrey. London, Annapolis, Md: Greenhill Books, Naval Institute Press. ISBN 1-55750-186-6.
- Busch, Rainer; Röll, Hans-Joachim (1999). Deutsche U-Boot-Verluste von September 1939 bis Mai 1945 [German U-boat losses from September 1939 to May 1945]. Der U-Boot-Krieg (in German). Vol. IV. Hamburg, Berlin, Bonn: Mittler. ISBN 3-8132-0514-2.
- Gröner, Erich; Jung, Dieter; Maass, Martin (1991). U-boats and Mine Warfare Vessels. German Warships 1815–1945. Vol. 2. Translated by Thomas, Keith; Magowan, Rachel. London: Conway Maritime Press. ISBN 0-85177-593-4.
- Sharpe, Peter (1998). U-Boat Fact File. Great Britain: Midland Publishing. ISBN 1-85780-072-9.
