= U-237 =

U-237 may refer to:

- German submarine U-237, a German Type VIIC submarine used in World War II
- Uranium-237 (U-237 or ^{237}U), an isotope of uranium
