= 6th U-boat Flotilla =

Flotilla unit of the Nazi Kriegsmarine

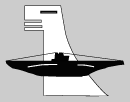
- Active: October 1938–December 1939; July 1941–August 1944
- Country: Nazi Germany
- Branch: Kriegsmarine
- Type: U-boat flotilla
- Garrison/HQ: Kiel, Danzig, St. Nazaire
- Nickname(s): Hundius Flotilla

Commanders
- Notable commanders: Korvettenkapitän Werner Hartmann; Korvettenkapitän Georg-Wilhelm Schulz; Kapitänleutnant Carl Emmermann

The 6th U-boat Flotilla (German 6. Unterseebootsflottille), also known as Hundius Flotilla, was a front-line unit of Nazi Germany's Kriegsmarine before and during World War II.

Formed on 1 October 1938 in Kiel under the command of Korvettenkapitän Werner Hartmann, it was named in honour of Kapitänleutnant Paul Hundius, a U-boat commander during World War I, that died on 16 September 1918 after his U-boat SM UB-103 was sunk by depth charges from British steamer Young Crow. The flotilla was disbanded in December 1939.

The flotilla was re-formed as "6th U-boat Flotilla" in July 1941 under the command of Korvettenkapitän Georg-Wilhelm Schulz with her base in Danzig. During the first months it was a training flotilla, but when it moved to St. Nazaire in February 1942 it became a combat flotilla. It was disbanded in August 1944, when the last boats left the base for Norway.

== Flotilla commanders ==
Commander	Duration
Korvettenkapitän Werner Hartmann	October 1938–December 1939
Korvettenkapitän Georg-Wilhelm Schulz	September 1941–November 1943
Kapitänleutnant Carl Emmermann	November 1942–August 1944

== Assigned U-boats ==
At one point in their service history, each of the following boats served with 6th flotilla

- U-37
- U-38
- U-39
- U-40
- U-41
- U-42
- U-43
- U-44
- U-87
- U-136
- U-209
- U-223
- U-226
- U-228
- U-229
- U-237
- U-251
- U-252
- U-253
- U-260
- U-261
- U-264
- U-269
- U-270
- U-277
- U-290
- U-308
- U-312
- U-335
- U-340
- U-356
- U-357
- U-376
- U-377
- U-380
- U-385
- U-386
- U-404
- U-405
- U-411
- U-414
- U-417
- U-436
- U-437
- U-445
- U-456
- U-457
- U-465
- U-477
- U-585
- U-586
- U-587
- U-588
- U-589
- U-590
- U-591
- U-592
- U-598
- U-608
- U-609
- U-610
- U-614
- U-616
- U-623
- U-626
- U-627
- U-640
- U-642
- U-648
- U-655
- U-658
- U-666
- U-668
- U-672
- U-673
- U-675
- U-680
- U-703
- U-705
- U-742
- U-756
- U-757
- U-758
- U-766
- U-964
- U-967
- U-972
- U-981
- U-982
- U-986
- U-999
