= German submarine U-921 =

German World War II submarine

- U-570 Type VIIC submarine that was captured by the British in 1941. This U-boat is almost identical to U-921.

History

Nazi Germany
- Name: U-921
- Ordered: 6 June 1941
- Builder: Neptun Werft AG, Rostock
- Yard number: 508
- Laid down: 15 October 1941
- Launched: 3 April 1943
- Commissioned: 30 May 1943
- Fate: Missing since 24 September 1944

General characteristics
- Class & type: Type VIIC submarine
- Displacement: 769 tonnes (757 long tons) surfaced; 871 t (857 long tons) submerged
- Length: 67.10 m (220 ft 2 in) o/a; 50.50 m (165 ft 8 in) pressure hull
- Beam: 6.20 m (20 ft 4 in) o/a; 4.70 m (15 ft 5 in) pressure hull
- Height: 9.60 m (31 ft 6 in)
- Draught: 4.74 m (15 ft 7 in)
- Installed power: 2,800–3,200 PS (2,100–2,400 kW; 2,800–3,200 bhp) (diesels); 750 PS (550 kW; 740 shp) (electric)
- Propulsion: 2 shafts; 2 × diesel engines; 2 × electric motors
- Speed: 17.7 knots (32.8 km/h; 20.4 mph) surfaced; 7.6 knots (14.1 km/h; 8.7 mph) submerged
- Range: 8,500 nmi (15,700 km; 9,800 mi) at 10 knots (19 km/h; 12 mph) surfaced; 80 nmi (150 km; 92 mi) at 4 knots (7.4 km/h; 4.6 mph) submerged
- Test depth: 220 m (720 ft); Crush depth: 250–295 m (820–968 ft)
- Complement: 4 officers, 44–52 enlisted
- Armament: 5 × 53.3 cm (21 in) torpedo tubes (four bow, one stern); 14 × torpedoes or; 26 TMA mines; 1 × 8.8 cm (3.46 in) deck gun (220 rounds); 1 × 3.7 cm (1.5 in) Flak M42 AA gun; 2 × twin 2 cm (0.79 in) C/30 anti-aircraft guns

Service record
- Part of: 8th U-boat Flotilla; 30 May 1943 – 31 May 1944; 13th U-boat Flotilla; 1 June – 24 September 1944
- Identification codes: M 50 627
- Commanders: Oblt.z.S. Wolfgang Leu; 30 May 1943 – 24 May 1944; Lt.z.S. Hans-Joachim Neumann; 24 – 31 May 1944; Oblt.z.S. Alfred Werner; 1 June – 24 September 1944
- Operations: 2 patrols: 1st patrol: a. 2 July – 7 August 1944; b. 8 – 9 August 1944; c. 2 – 3 September 1944; 2nd patrol: 5 – 24 September 1944
- Victories: None

German submarine U-921 was a Type VIIC U-boat of Nazi Germany's Kriegsmarine during World War II.

She was ordered on 6 June 1941, and was laid down on 15 October 1941 at Neptun Werft AG, Rostock, as yard number 508. She was launched on 3 April 1943 and commissioned under the command of Oberleutnant zur See Wolfgang Leu on 30 May 1943.

== Design ==
German Type VIIC submarines were preceded by the shorter Type VIIB submarines. U-921 had a displacement of 769 tonnes (757 long tons) when at the surface and 871 tonnes (857 long tons) while submerged. She had a total length of 67.10 m (220 ft 2 in), a pressure hull length of 50.50 m (165 ft 8 in), a beam of 6.20 m (20 ft 4 in), a height of 9.60 m (31 ft 6 in), and a draught of 4.74 m (15 ft 7 in). The submarine was powered by two Germaniawerft F46 four-stroke, six-cylinder supercharged diesel engines producing a total of 2,800 to 3,200 metric horsepower (2,060 to 2,350 kW; 2,760 to 3,160 shp) for use while surfaced, two SSW GU 343/38-8 double-acting electric motors producing a total of 750 metric horsepower (550 kW; 740 shp) for use while submerged. She had two shafts and two 1.23 m (4 ft) propellers. The boat was capable of operating at depths of up to 230 metres (750 ft).

The submarine had a maximum surface speed of 17.7 knots (32.8 km/h; 20.4 mph) and a maximum submerged speed of 7.6 knots (14.1 km/h; 8.7 mph). When submerged, the boat could operate for 80 nautical miles (150 km; 92 mi) at 4 knots (7.4 km/h; 4.6 mph); when surfaced, she could travel 8,500 nautical miles (15,700 km; 9,800 mi) at 10 knots (19 km/h; 12 mph). U-921 was fitted with five 53.3 cm (21 in) torpedo tubes (four fitted at the bow and one at the stern), fourteen torpedoes or 26 TMA mines, one 8.8 cm (3.46 in) SK C/35 naval gun, (220 rounds), one 3.7 cm (1.5 in) Flak M42 and two twin 2 cm (0.79 in) C/30 anti-aircraft guns. The boat had a complement of between 44 — 52 men.

== Service history ==
On 24 May 1944, U-921 was spotted off Norway, en route to Narvik, by a Canadian Sunderland, DV990, of 422/R Squadron RCAF piloted by F/O G.E. Holley. U-921 had been searching for U-476 which had been attacked from the air earlier in the day and badly damaged. U-921 was able to hit the Sunderland on its attack run causing it to crash into the sea after dropping three depth charges, which resulted in no damage to U-921 but all the crewmen of the Sunderland were lost.

Shortly after this first attack U-921 was sighted by another Canadian Sunderland, DW111, of 423/S Squadron RCAF piloted by F/L R.H. Nesbitt. U-921 was able to avoid the five depth charges dropped by the Sunderland but strafing wounded the commander, Oberleutnant zur See Wolfgang Leu, and two other crewmen. As U-921 was diving, Leu was able to get both of the wounded crewmen below, but then closed the hatch to prevent her from sinking, sacrificing himself. U-921 sailed for Trondheim, arriving 26 May 1944, under command of her I. WO (1st Wachoffizier) Leutnant zur See Hans-Joachim Neumann.

On 24 September 1944, 20 days into her second war patrol, U-921 sent her last radio transmission from 74°45′N 13°50′E, west of Bear Island in the Norwegian Sea, in which she stated that, due to unspecified damage, she needed to return to port. U-921 was ordered to continue to operate against Convoy RA 60 and postpone her return. On 2 October 1944 she was listed as missing when, after the end of the convoy battle, she failed to return to Narvik.

=== Wolfpacks ===
U-921 took part in one wolfpack, namely:

- Grimm (9 September — 2 October 1944)

== Bibliography ==
- Busch, Rainer; Röll, Hans-Joachim (1999). German U-boat commanders of World War II : a biographical dictionary. Translated by Brooks, Geoffrey. London, Annapolis, Md: Greenhill Books, Naval Institute Press. ISBN 1-55750-186-6.
- Busch, Rainer; Röll, Hans-Joachim (1999). Der U-Boot-Krieg, 1939-1945: Deutsche U-Boot-Verluste von September 1939 bis Mai 1945 [German U-boat losses from September 1939 to May 1945] (in German). Vol. IV. Hamburg, Berlin, Bonn: Mittler. ISBN 3-8132-0514-2.
- Gröner, Eric; Jung, Dieter; Maass, Martin (1991). German Warships 1815-1945: U-boats and Mine Warfare Vessels. Vol. 2. Translated by Thomas, Keith; Magowan, Rachel. London: Conway Maritime Press. ISBN 0-85177-593-4.
