= German submarine U-673 =

German World War II submarine

Coordinates: 59°17′N 5°57′E

History

Nazi Germany
- Name: U-673
- Ordered: 20 January 1941
- Builder: Howaldtswerke, Hamburg
- Yard number: 822
- Laid down: 20 January 1942
- Launched: 27 February 1943
- Commissioned: 8 May 1943
- Fate: Beached after collision with U-382 on 24 October 1944

General characteristics
- Class & type: Type VIIC submarine
- Displacement: 769 t (757 long tons) surfaced; 871 t (857 long tons) submerged
- Length: 67.10 m (220 ft 2 in) (o/a); 50.50 m (165 ft 8 in) (pressure hull)
- Beam: 6.20 m (20 ft 4 in) (o/a); 4.70 m (15 ft 5 in) (pressure hull)
- Height: 9.60 m (31 ft 6 in)
- Draught: 4.74 m (15 ft 7 in)
- Installed power: 2,800–3,200 PS (2,100–2,400 kW; 2,800–3,200 bhp) (diesels); 750 PS (550 kW; 740 shp) (electric)
- Propulsion: 2 shafts; 2 × diesel engines; 2 × electric motors
- Speed: 17.7 knots (32.8 km/h; 20.4 mph) surfaced; 7.6 knots (14.1 km/h; 8.7 mph) submerged
- Range: 8,500 nmi (15,700 km; 9,800 mi) at 10 knots (19 km/h; 12 mph) surfaced; 80 nmi (150 km; 92 mi) at 4 knots (7.4 km/h; 4.6 mph) submerged
- Test depth: 230 m (750 ft); Crush depth: 250–295 m (820–968 ft)
- Complement: 4 officers, 40–56 enlisted
- Armament: 5 × torpedo tubes (four bow, one stern); 14 × 53.3 cm (21 in) torpedoes or 26 TMA mines; 1 × 3.7 cm (1.5 in) Flak M42 AA gun; 2 × twin 2 cm (0.79 in) C/30 anti-aircraft guns

Service record
- Part of: 5th U-boat Flotilla; 8 May 1943 – 31 May 1944; 6th U-boat Flotilla; 1 – 20 June 1944; 13th U-boat Flotilla; 21 June – 31 July 1944; 6th U-boat Flotilla; 1 August – 24 October 1944
- Identification codes: M 37 961
- Commanders: Kptlt. Gerhard Haelbich; 8 May – 14 August 1943; Oblt.z.S. Heinz-Gerd Sauer; 15 August 1943 – 31 July 1944; Oblt.z.S. Ernst-August Gerke; 1 August – 24 October 1944
- Operations: 5 patrols: 1st patrol: a. 20 – 27 February 1944; b. 29 February – 2 March 1944; c. 24 – 26 March 1944; 2nd patrol: a. 27 March – 4 April 1944; b. 6 – 9 April 1944; c. 19 – 21 May 1944; d. 29 – 31 May 1944; 3rd patrol: 4 June – 24 July 1944; 4th patrol: 14 September – 19 October 1944; 5th patrol: 22 – 24 October 1944
- Victories: None

German submarine U-673 was a Type VIIC U-boat of Nazi Germany's Kriegsmarine during World War II. The submarine was laid down on 20 January 1942 at the Howaldtswerke yard at Hamburg, launched on 27 February 1943, and commissioned on 8 May 1943 under the command of Oberleutnant zur See Gerhard Haelbich.

Attached to 5th U-boat Flotilla based at Kiel, U-673 completed her training period on 31 May 1944 and was assigned to front-line service.

== Design ==
German Type VIIC submarines were preceded by the shorter Type VIIB submarines. U-673 had a displacement of 769 tonnes (757 long tons) when at the surface and 871 tonnes (857 long tons) while submerged. She had a total length of 67.10 m (220 ft 2 in), a pressure hull length of 50.50 m (165 ft 8 in), a beam of 6.20 m (20 ft 4 in), a height of 9.60 m (31 ft 6 in), and a draught of 4.74 m (15 ft 7 in). The submarine was powered by two Germaniawerft F46 four-stroke, six-cylinder supercharged diesel engines producing a total of 2,800 to 3,200 metric horsepower (2,060 to 2,350 kW; 2,760 to 3,160 shp) for use while surfaced, two Siemens-Schuckert GU 343/38–8 double-acting electric motors producing a total of 750 metric horsepower (550 kW; 740 shp) for use while submerged. She had two shafts and two 1.23 m (4 ft) propellers. The boat was capable of operating at depths of up to 230 metres (750 ft).

The submarine had a maximum surface speed of 17.7 knots (32.8 km/h; 20.4 mph) and a maximum submerged speed of 7.6 knots (14.1 km/h; 8.7 mph). When submerged, the boat could operate for 80 nautical miles (150 km; 92 mi) at 4 knots (7.4 km/h; 4.6 mph); when surfaced, she could travel 8,500 nautical miles (15,700 km; 9,800 mi) at 10 knots (19 km/h; 12 mph). U-673 was fitted with five 53.3 cm (21 in) torpedo tubes (four fitted at the bow and one at the stern), fourteen torpedoes, one 3.7 cm (1.5 in) Flak M42 and two twin 2 cm (0.79 in) C/30 anti-aircraft guns. The boat had a complement of between forty-four and sixty.

== Service history ==
On 14 September 1944, U-673 left St. Nazaire, France, for Norway, reaching Bergen on 19 October 1944. There the U-boat joined a convoy south. Early on 24 October 1944, U-673 collided with U-382 north of Stavanger and was beached at Smaaskjaer. Later the U-boat was salvaged and towed to Stavanger. U-673 remained in Stavanger for the rest of the war and became British war booty in 1945. In 1946 the U-boat was broken up for scrap.

== Bibliography ==
- Busch, Rainer; Röll, Hans-Joachim (1999a). German U-boat commanders of World War II : a biographical dictionary. Translated by Brooks, Geoffrey. London, Annapolis, Md: Greenhill Books, Naval Institute Press. ISBN 1-55750-186-6.
- Busch, Rainer; Röll, Hans-Joachim (1999b). Der U-Boot-Krieg, 1939-1945: Deutsche U-Boot-Verluste von September 1939 bis Mai 1945 [German U-boat losses from September 1939 to May 1945] (in German). Vol. IV. Hamburg, Berlin, Bonn: Mittler. ISBN 3-8132-0514-2.
- Gröner, Eric; Jung, Dieter; Maass, Martin (1991). German Warships 1815-1945: U-boats and Mine Warfare Vessels. Vol. 2. Translated by Thomas, Keith; Magowan, Rachel. London: Conway Maritime Press. ISBN 0-85177-593-4.
