= 13th U-boat Flotilla =

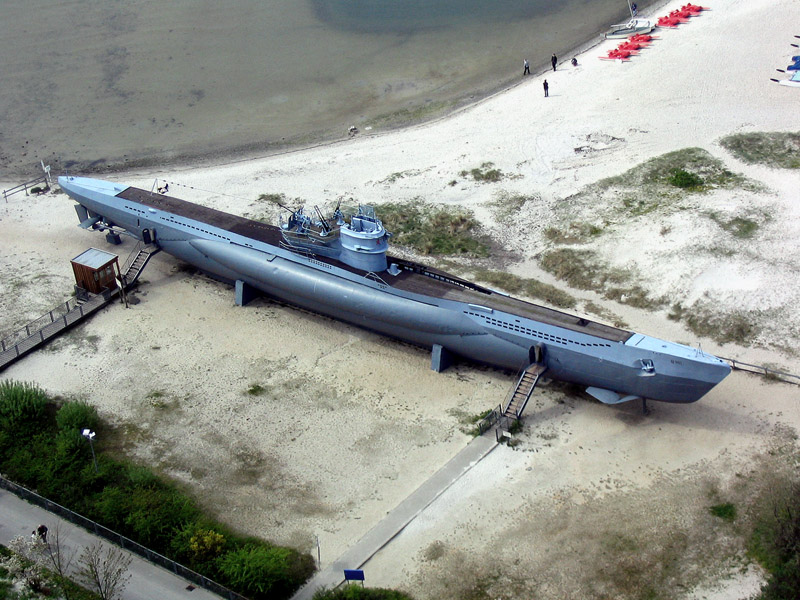
- U-995 is the only surviving Type VIIC/41 submarine; after service in the Kriegsmarine during World War II, she served as HNoMS Kaura in the Royal Norwegian Navy and is now a museum ship in Germany.
- Active: June 1943 – May 1945
- Country: Nazi Germany
- Branch: Kriegsmarine
- Type: U-boat flotilla
- Garrison/HQ: Trondheim, Norway
- Engagements: World War II: Battle of the Atlantic

Commanders
- Notable commanders: Korvettenkapitän Rolf Rüggeberg

Insignia
- The 13th Flotilla emblem

The 13th U-boat Flotilla (German 13. Unterseebootsflottille) was a World War II U-boat unit of Nazi Germany's Kriegsmarine stationed in Trondheim, Norway. The emblem of the unit was a cross with a Viking ship in the middle.

== History ==
In 1941, construction of the DORA 1 submarine base started in Trondheim. Two years later, in June 1943, it was handed over to the flotilla commander, Korvettenkapitän (later Fregattenkapitän) Rolf Rüggeberg. The 13th submarine flotilla was a front line unit, and a total of 55 Type VIIC and VIIC/41 served with it until the end of the war in May 1945.

== Vessels ==
13th U-boat Flotilla
Number	Type	Service in 13.
U-212	VIIC	June 1, 1943 - October 31, 1943
U-251	VIIC	June 1, 1943 - June 30, 1943
U-255	VIIC	June 1, 1943 - November 30, 1943
U-277	VIIC	November 1, 1943 - May 1, 1944
U-278	VIIC	September 1, 1944 - May 8, 1945
U-286	VIIC	November 5, 1944 - February 28, 1945
U-288	VIIC	February 1, 1944 - April 3, 1944
U-289	VIIC	May 1, 1944 - May 31, 1944
U-293	VIIC/41	September 5, 1944 - May 8, 1945
U-294	VIIC/41	November 6, 1944 - February 28, 1945
U-295	VIIC/41	October 1, 1944 - March 31, 1945
U-299	VIIC/41	November 5, 1944 - February 28, 1945
U-302	VIIC	June 1, 1943 - October 31, 1943
U-307	VIIC	November 1, 1943 - April 29, 1945
U-310	VIIC	September 5, 1944 - May 8, 1945
U-312	VIIC	September 1, 1944 - May 8, 1945
U-313	VIIC	September 15, 1944 - May 8, 1945
U-315	VIIC	September 15, 1944 - May 8, 1945
U-318	VIIC/41	November 5, 1944 - February 28, 1945
U-354	VIIC	June 1, 1943 - August 24, 1944
U-360	VIIC	July 1, 1943 - April 2, 1944
U-362	VIIC	March 1, 1944 - September 5, 1944
U-363	VIIC	September 15, 1944 - May 8, 1945
U-365	VIIC	June 9, 1944 - December 13, 1944
U-366	VIIC	March 1, 1944 - March 5, 1944
U-387	VIIC	November 1, 1943 - December 9, 1944
U-425	VIIC	September 15, 1944 - February 17, 1945
U-427	VIIC	November 5, 1944 - February 28, 1945
U-586	VIIC	June 1, 1943 - September 30, 1943
U-601	VIIC	June 1, 1943 - February 25, 1944
U-622	VIIC	June 1, 1943 - July 24, 1943
U-625	VIIC	June 1, 1943 - October 31, 1943
U-636	VIIC	November 1, 1943 - April 21, 1945
U-639	VIIC	June 1, 1943 - August 28, 1943
U-668	VIIC	June 1, 1944 - May 8, 1945
U-673	VIIC	June 21, 1944 - July 31, 1944
U-703	VIIC	June 1, 1943 - September 16, 1944
U-711	VIIC	June 1, 1943 - May 4, 1945
U-713	VIIC	November 1, 1943 - February 24, 1944
U-716	VIIC	October 1, 1944 - March 31, 1945
U-737	VIIC	July 1, 1943 - December 19, 1944
U-739	VIIC	January 1, 1944 - May 8, 1945
U-742	VIIC	June 1, 1944 - July 18, 1944
U-771	VIIC	October 1, 1944 - November 11, 1944
U-921	VIIC	June 1, 1944 - October 2, 1944
U-956	VIIC	October 1, 1944 - May 8, 1945
U-957	VIIC	October 1, 1944 - October 21, 1944
U-959	VIIC	March 1, 1944 - May 2, 1944
U-965	VIIC	October 1, 1944 - March 30, 1945
U-968	VIIC	March 1, 1944 - May 8, 1945
U-992	VIIC	October 1, 1944 - May 8, 1945
U-994	VIIC	November 5, 1944 - May 8, 1945
U-995	VIIC/41	June 1, 1944 - February 28, 1945
U-997	VIIC/41	June 1, 1944 - March 1, 1945
U-1163	VIIC/41	October 1, 1944 - May 8, 1945
