= German submarine U-289 =

German World War II submarine

Coordinates: 73°32′N 0°28′E

History

Nazi Germany
- Name: U-289
- Ordered: 5 June 1941
- Builder: Bremer Vulkan, Bremen-Vegesack
- Yard number: 54
- Laid down: 12 September 1942
- Launched: 25 May 1943
- Commissioned: 10 July 1943
- Fate: Sunk on 31 May 1944

General characteristics
- Class & type: Type VIIC submarine
- Displacement: 769 tonnes (757 long tons) surfaced; 871 t (857 long tons) submerged
- Length: 67.10 m (220 ft 2 in) o/a; 50.50 m (165 ft 8 in) pressure hull
- Beam: 6.20 m (20 ft 4 in) o/a; 4.70 m (15 ft 5 in) pressure hull
- Height: 9.60 m (31 ft 6 in)
- Draught: 4.74 m (15 ft 7 in)
- Installed power: 2,800–3,200 PS (2,100–2,400 kW; 2,800–3,200 bhp) (diesels); 750 PS (550 kW; 740 shp) (electric)
- Propulsion: 2 shafts; 2 × diesel engines; 2 × electric motors
- Speed: 17.7 knots (32.8 km/h; 20.4 mph) surfaced; 7.6 knots (14.1 km/h; 8.7 mph) submerged
- Range: 8,500 nmi (15,700 km; 9,800 mi) at 10 knots (19 km/h; 12 mph) surfaced; 80 nmi (150 km; 92 mi) at 4 knots (7.4 km/h; 4.6 mph) submerged
- Test depth: 230 m (750 ft); Crush depth: 250–295 m (820–968 ft)
- Complement: 4 officers, 40–56 enlisted
- Armament: 5 × 53.3 cm (21 in) torpedo tubes (four bow, one stern); 14 × torpedoes or 26 TMA mines; 1 × 3.7 cm (1.5 in) Flak M42 AA gun; 2 × twin 2 cm (0.79 in) C/30 anti-aircraft guns

Service record
- Part of: 8th U-boat Flotilla; 10 July 1943 – 31 March 1944; 3rd U-boat Flotilla; 1 April – 1 May 1944; 13th U-boat Flotilla; 1 – 31 May 1944
- Identification codes: M 53 080
- Commanders: Kptlt. Alexander Hellwig; 10 July 1943 – 31 May 1944
- Operations: 2 patrols: 1st patrol: 19 April – 6 May 1944; 2nd patrol: 12 – 31 May 1944
- Victories: None

German submarine U-289 was a Type VIIC U-boat of Nazi Germany's Kriegsmarine during World War II.

The submarine was laid down on 12 September 1942 at the Bremer Vulkan yard at Bremen-Vegesack as yard number 54. She was launched on 25 May 1943 and commissioned on 10 July under the command of Kapitänleutnant Alexander Hellwig.

She did not sink or damage any ships.

She was sunk by a British destroyer on 31 May 1944.

== Design ==
German Type VIIC submarines were preceded by the shorter Type VIIB submarines. U-289 had a displacement of 769 tonnes (757 long tons) when at the surface and 871 tonnes (857 long tons) while submerged. She had a total length of 67.10 m (220 ft 2 in), a pressure hull length of 50.50 m (165 ft 8 in), a beam of 6.20 m (20 ft 4 in), a height of 9.60 m (31 ft 6 in), and a draught of 4.74 m (15 ft 7 in). The submarine was powered by two Germaniawerft F46 four-stroke, six-cylinder supercharged diesel engines producing a total of 2,800 to 3,200 metric horsepower (2,060 to 2,350 kW; 2,760 to 3,160 shp) for use while surfaced, two AEG GU 460/8–27 double-acting electric motors producing a total of 750 metric horsepower (550 kW; 740 shp) for use while submerged. She had two shafts and two 1.23 m (4 ft) propellers. The boat was capable of operating at depths of up to 230 metres (750 ft).

The submarine had a maximum surface speed of 17.7 knots (32.8 km/h; 20.4 mph) and a maximum submerged speed of 7.6 knots (14.1 km/h; 8.7 mph). When submerged, the boat could operate for 80 nautical miles (150 km; 92 mi) at 4 knots (7.4 km/h; 4.6 mph); when surfaced, she could travel 8,500 nautical miles (15,700 km; 9,800 mi) at 10 knots (19 km/h; 12 mph). U-289 was fitted with five 53.3 cm (21 in) torpedo tubes (four fitted at the bow and one at the stern), fourteen torpedoes, one 3.7 cm (1.5 in) Flak M42 and two twin 2 cm (0.79 in) C/30 anti-aircraft guns. The boat had a complement of between forty-four and sixty.

== Service history ==
U-289 served with the 8th U-boat Flotilla for training from July 1943 to March 1944 and operationally with the 3rd flotilla from 1 April. She was reassigned to the 13th flotilla in early May 1944.

=== First patrol ===
The boat's initial foray, which was preceded by a short voyage from Kiel to Bergen in Norway, began with her departure from the Nordic port on 19 April 1944 and finished at Narvik on 6 May.

=== Second patrol and loss ===
She departed Narvik on 12 May 1944. On the 31st she was sunk by depth charges dropped by the British destroyer HMS Milne northeast of Jan Mayen Island.

Fifty-one men died; there were no survivors.

== Bibliography ==
- Busch, Rainer; Röll, Hans-Joachim (1999). German U-boat commanders of World War II : a biographical dictionary. Translated by Brooks, Geoffrey. London, Annapolis, Md: Greenhill Books, Naval Institute Press. ISBN 1-55750-186-6.
- Busch, Rainer; Röll, Hans-Joachim (1999). Deutsche U-Boot-Verluste von September 1939 bis Mai 1945 [German U-boat losses from September 1939 to May 1945]. Der U-Boot-Krieg (in German). Vol. IV. Hamburg, Berlin, Bonn: Mittler. ISBN 3-8132-0514-2.
- Gröner, Erich; Jung, Dieter; Maass, Martin (1991). U-boats and Mine Warfare Vessels. German Warships 1815–1945. Vol. 2. Translated by Thomas, Keith; Magowan, Rachel. London: Conway Maritime Press. ISBN 0-85177-593-4.
- Kemp, Paul (1999). U-Boats Destroyed – German Submarine Losses in the World Wars. London: Arms & Armour. ISBN 1-85409-515-3.
