= German submarine U-705 =

German World War II submarine

History

Nazi Germany
- Name: U-705
- Ordered: 9 October 1939
- Builder: HC Stülcken & Sohn, Hamburg
- Yard number: 764
- Laid down: 11 October 1940
- Launched: 13 October 1941
- Commissioned: 30 December 1941
- Fate: Sunk on 3 September 1942

General characteristics
- Class & type: Type VIIC submarine
- Displacement: 769 tonnes (757 long tons) surfaced; 871 t (857 long tons) submerged
- Length: 67.10 m (220 ft 2 in) o/a; 50.50 m (165 ft 8 in) pressure hull
- Beam: 6.20 m (20 ft 4 in) o/a; 4.70 m (15 ft 5 in) pressure hull
- Height: 9.60 m (31 ft 6 in)
- Draught: 4.74 m (15 ft 7 in)
- Installed power: 2,800–3,200 PS (2,100–2,400 kW; 2,800–3,200 bhp) (diesels); 750 PS (550 kW; 740 shp) (electric)
- Propulsion: 2 shafts; 2 × diesel engines; 2 × electric motors
- Speed: 17.7 knots (32.8 km/h; 20.4 mph) surfaced; 7.6 knots (14.1 km/h; 8.7 mph) submerged
- Range: 8,500 nmi (15,700 km; 9,800 mi) at 10 knots (19 km/h; 12 mph) surfaced; 80 nmi (150 km; 92 mi) at 4 knots (7.4 km/h; 4.6 mph) submerged
- Test depth: 230 m (750 ft); Crush depth: 250–295 m (820–968 ft)
- Complement: 4 officers, 40–56 enlisted
- Armament: 5 × 53.3 cm (21 in) torpedo tubes (four bow, one stern); 14 × torpedoes; 1 × 8.8 cm (3.46 in) deck gun (220 rounds); 1 x 2 cm (0.79 in) C/30 AA gun

Service record
- Part of: 5th U-boat Flotilla; 30 December 1941 – 31 July 1942; 6th U-boat Flotilla; 1 August – 3 September 1942
- Identification codes: M 46 975
- Commanders: Oblt.z.S. / Kptlt. Karl-Horst Horn; 30 December 1941 – 3 September 1942
- Operations: 1 patrol: 1 August – 3 September 1942
- Victories: 1 merchant ship sunk (3,279 GRT)

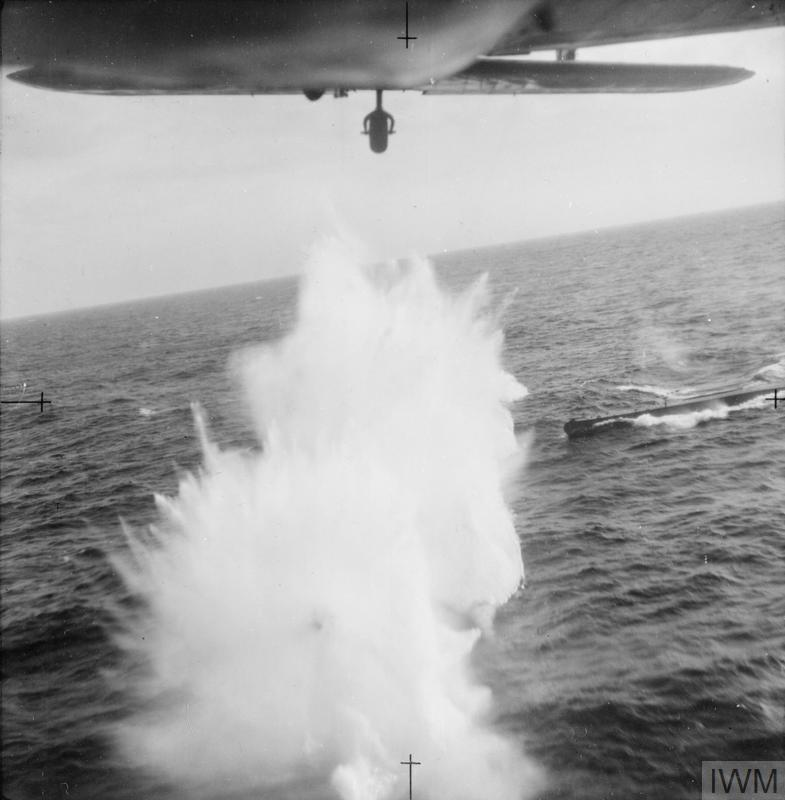
Royal Air Force attacking U-705

German submarine U-705 was a Type VIIC U-boat of Nazi Germany's Kriegsmarine during World War II.

Commissioned on 30 December 1941, she served with the 5th U-boat Flotilla until 31 July 1942 as a training boat, and as a front boat of 6th U-boat Flotilla under the command of Oberleutnant zur See Karl-Horst Horn, until her sinking on 3 September 1942.

== Design ==
German Type VIIC submarines were preceded by the shorter Type VIIB submarines. U-705 had a displacement of 769 tonnes (757 long tons) when at the surface and 871 tonnes (857 long tons) while submerged. She had a total length of 67.10 m (220 ft 2 in), a pressure hull length of 50.50 m (165 ft 8 in), a beam of 6.20 m (20 ft 4 in), a height of 9.60 m (31 ft 6 in), and a draught of 4.74 m (15 ft 7 in). The submarine was powered by two Germaniawerft F46 four-stroke, six-cylinder supercharged diesel engines producing a total of 2,800 to 3,200 metric horsepower (2,060 to 2,350 kW; 2,760 to 3,160 shp) for use while surfaced, two AEG GU 460/8–27 double-acting electric motors producing a total of 750 metric horsepower (550 kW; 740 shp) for use while submerged. She had two shafts and two 1.23 m (4 ft) propellers. The boat was capable of operating at depths of up to 230 metres (750 ft).

The submarine had a maximum surface speed of 17.7 knots (32.8 km/h; 20.4 mph) and a maximum submerged speed of 7.6 knots (14.1 km/h; 8.7 mph). When submerged, the boat could operate for 80 nautical miles (150 km; 92 mi) at 4 knots (7.4 km/h; 4.6 mph); when surfaced, she could travel 8,500 nautical miles (15,700 km; 9,800 mi) at 10 knots (19 km/h; 12 mph). U-705 was fitted with five 53.3 cm (21 in) torpedo tubes (four fitted at the bow and one at the stern), fourteen torpedoes, one 8.8 cm (3.46 in) SK C/35 naval gun, 220 rounds, and a 2 cm (0.79 in) C/30 anti-aircraft gun. The boat had a complement of between forty-four and sixty.

== Service history ==
Departing on her first and only patrol on 1 August 1942, U-705 left Kiel to encircle the British Isles and turn back after crossing more than half of the Atlantic. On 15 August while cruising some 550 nautical miles (1,020 km) south-east of Iceland, she caught sight of a number of vessels; Convoy SC 95, and the merchant ship Balladier.

Diving after first being seen, she stayed submerged for nearly four hours before firing a torpedo at the starboard side of the Balladier. Listing to the starboard side, the armed guards were unable to return fire on U-705, with the ship sinking after seven minutes.

On 24 August, the Norwegian corvette HNoMS Potentilla and HMS Viscount of convoy ON 122 located U-705. Dropping five depth charges from the Viscount, along with a further ten from the Potentilla, the two were unable to cause damage to the boat. A further fifty-seven charges were dropped at her and U-135, finally damaging her stern torpedo tube.

=== Fate ===
On 3 September 1942, Armstrong Whitworth Whitleys of No. 77 Squadron RAF dropped depth charges at U-705, causing her to sink with all hands lost in the Bay of Biscay.

=== Wolfpacks ===
U-705 took part in one wolfpack, namely:

- Lohs (11 – 26 August 1942)

== Summary of raiding history ==
Date	Ship Name	Nationality	Tonnage (GRT)	Fate
15 August 1942	Balladier	United States	3,279	Sunk

== Bibliography ==
- Busch, Rainer; Röll, Hans-Joachim (1999). German U-boat commanders of World War II : a biographical dictionary. Translated by Brooks, Geoffrey. London, Annapolis, Md: Greenhill Books, Naval Institute Press. ISBN 1-55750-186-6.
- Busch, Rainer; Röll, Hans-Joachim (1999). Der U-Boot-Krieg, 1939-1945: Deutsche U-Boot-Verluste von September 1939 bis Mai 1945 [German U-boat losses from September 1939 to May 1945] (in German). Vol. IV. Hamburg, Berlin, Bonn: Mittler. ISBN 3-8132-0514-2.
- Gröner, Eric; Jung, Dieter; Maass, Martin (1991). German Warships 1815-1945: U-boats and Mine Warfare Vessels. Vol. 2. Translated by Thomas, Keith; Magowan, Rachel. London: Conway Maritime Press. ISBN 0-85177-593-4.
