= German submarine U-290 =

German World War II submarine

History

Nazi Germany
- Name: U-290
- Ordered: 5 June 1941
- Builder: Bremer Vulkan, Bremen-Vegesack
- Yard number: 55
- Laid down: 12 October 1942
- Launched: 16 June 1943
- Commissioned: 24 July 1943
- Fate: Scuttled on 5 May 1945 in Flensburg Fjord

General characteristics
- Class & type: Type VIIC submarine
- Displacement: 769 tonnes (757 long tons) surfaced; 871 t (857 long tons) submerged
- Length: 67.10 m (220 ft 2 in) o/a; 50.50 m (165 ft 8 in) pressure hull
- Beam: 6.20 m (20 ft 4 in) o/a; 4.70 m (15 ft 5 in) pressure hull
- Height: 9.60 m (31 ft 6 in)
- Draught: 4.74 m (15 ft 7 in)
- Installed power: 2,800–3,200 PS (2,100–2,400 kW; 2,800–3,200 bhp) (diesels); 750 PS (550 kW; 740 shp) (electric)
- Propulsion: 2 shafts; 2 × diesel engines; 2 × electric motors
- Speed: 17.7 knots (32.8 km/h; 20.4 mph) surfaced; 7.6 knots (14.1 km/h; 8.7 mph) submerged
- Range: 8,500 nmi (15,700 km; 9,800 mi) at 10 knots (19 km/h; 12 mph) surfaced; 80 nmi (150 km; 92 mi) at 4 knots (7.4 km/h; 4.6 mph) submerged
- Test depth: 230 m (750 ft); Crush depth: 250–295 m (820–968 ft)
- Complement: 4 officers, 40–56 enlisted
- Armament: 5 × 53.3 cm (21 in) torpedo tubes (four bow, one stern); 14 × torpedoes or 26 TMA mines; 1 × 3.7 cm (1.5 in) Flak M42 AA gun; 2 × twin 2 cm (0.79 in) C/30 anti-aircraft guns

Service record
- Part of: 8th U-boat Flotilla; 24 July 1943 – 30 April 1944; 6th U-boat Flotilla; 1 May – 31 July 1944; 11th U-boat Flotilla; 1 – 27 August 1944; 8th U-boat Flotilla; 28 August 1944 – 15 February 1945; 4th U-boat Flotilla; 16 February – 5 May 1945
- Identification codes: M 53 114
- Commanders: Kptlt. Hartmut Strenger; 24 July – 26 December 1943; Oblt.z.S. Helmut Herglotz; 27 December 1943 – April 1945; Oblt.z.S.d.R. Heinz Baum; April – 5 May 1945
- Operations: 3 patrols: 1st patrol: a. 1 – 16 June 1944; b. 15 – 17 July 1944; c. 12 – 13 August 1944; d. 15 – 17 August 1944; 2nd patrol: a. 7 September – 5 November 1944; b. 30 – 31 December 1944; 3rd patrol: 1 – 29 January 1945
- Victories: None

German submarine U-290 was a Type VIIC U-boat of Nazi Germany's Kriegsmarine during World War II.

The submarine was laid down on 12 October 1942 at the Bremer Vulkan yard at Bremen-Vegesack as yard number 55. She was launched on 16 June 1943 and commissioned on 24 July under the command of Oberleutnant zur See Hartmut Strenger.

She did not sink or damage any ships.

She was scuttled in Flensburg Fjord on 5 May 1945.

== Design ==
German Type VIIC submarines were preceded by the shorter Type VIIB submarines. U-290 had a displacement of 769 tonnes (757 long tons) when at the surface and 871 tonnes (857 long tons) while submerged. She had a total length of 67.10 m (220 ft 2 in), a pressure hull length of 50.50 m (165 ft 8 in), a beam of 6.20 m (20 ft 4 in), a height of 9.60 m (31 ft 6 in), and a draught of 4.74 m (15 ft 7 in). The submarine was powered by two Germaniawerft F46 four-stroke, six-cylinder supercharged diesel engines producing a total of 2,800 to 3,200 metric horsepower (2,060 to 2,350 kW; 2,760 to 3,160 shp) for use while surfaced, two AEG GU 460/8–27 double-acting electric motors producing a total of 750 metric horsepower (550 kW; 740 shp) for use while submerged. She had two shafts and two 1.23 m (4 ft) propellers. The boat was capable of operating at depths of up to 230 metres (750 ft).

The submarine had a maximum surface speed of 17.7 knots (32.8 km/h; 20.4 mph) and a maximum submerged speed of 7.6 knots (14.1 km/h; 8.7 mph). When submerged, the boat could operate for 80 nautical miles (150 km; 92 mi) at 4 knots (7.4 km/h; 4.6 mph); when surfaced, she could travel 8,500 nautical miles (15,700 km; 9,800 mi) at 10 knots (19 km/h; 12 mph). U-290 was fitted with five 53.3 cm (21 in) torpedo tubes (four fitted at the bow and one at the stern), fourteen torpedoes, one 3.7 cm (1.5 in) Flak M42 and two twin 2 cm (0.79 in) C/30 anti-aircraft guns. The boat had a complement of between forty-four and sixty.

== Service history ==
U-290 served with the 8th U-boat Flotilla for training from July 1943 to April 1944 and operationally with the 6th flotilla from 1 May. She was reassigned to the 11th flotilla in August. She was transferred twice more, first back to the 8th flotilla in late August, then the 4th flotilla in mid-February 1945.

=== First patrol ===
The boat's initial foray, which was preceded by a short voyage from Kiel to Egersund (southeast of Stavanger) in Norway, began with her departure from the Nordic port on 1 June 1944 and finished at Bergen on 16 June.

She had been attacked by a Norwegian De Havilland Mosquito of No. 333 Squadron RAF on 14 June. Eight of her crew were wounded.

A series of brief journeys then followed, between Bergen, Kristiansand, Kiel and Gotenhafen (now Gdynia, Poland).

=== Second patrol ===
She departed Gotenhafen on 7 September 1944. After patrolling the Baltic, she docked at Danzig (now Gdańsk, Poland) on 5 November.

=== Third patrol and fate ===
After sailing to Libau in western Latvia, she departed from there on 1 January 1945, arriving in Kiel on the 29th.

She was scuttled in Kupfermühle Bay, part of Flensburg Fjord, on 5 May 1945.

== Bibliography ==
- Busch, Rainer; Röll, Hans-Joachim (1999). German U-boat commanders of World War II : a biographical dictionary. Translated by Brooks, Geoffrey. London, Annapolis, Md: Greenhill Books, Naval Institute Press. ISBN 1-55750-186-6.
- Busch, Rainer; Röll, Hans-Joachim (1999). Deutsche U-Boot-Verluste von September 1939 bis Mai 1945 [German U-boat losses from September 1939 to May 1945]. Der U-Boot-Krieg (in German). Vol. IV. Hamburg, Berlin, Bonn: Mittler. ISBN 3-8132-0514-2.
- Gröner, Erich; Jung, Dieter; Maass, Martin (1991). German Warships 1815–1945, U-boats and Mine Warfare Vessels. Vol. 2. Translated by Thomas, Keith; Magowan, Rachel. London: Conway Maritime Press. ISBN 0-85177-593-4.
