= German submarine U-312 =

German World War II submarine

Coordinates: 55°35′N 7°54′W

History

Nazi Germany
- Name: U-312
- Ordered: 5 June 1941
- Builder: Flender Werke, Lübeck
- Yard number: 312
- Laid down: 10 April 1942
- Launched: 27 February 1943
- Commissioned: 21 April 1943
- Fate: Surrendered on 9 May 1945, sunk as part of Operation Deadlight on 29 November 1945

General characteristics
- Class & type: Type VIIC submarine
- Displacement: 769 tonnes (757 long tons) surfaced; 871 t (857 long tons) submerged
- Length: 67.10 m (220 ft 2 in) o/a; 50.50 m (165 ft 8 in) pressure hull
- Beam: 6.20 m (20 ft 4 in) o/a; 4.70 m (15 ft 5 in) pressure hull
- Height: 9.60 m (31 ft 6 in)
- Draught: 4.74 m (15 ft 7 in)
- Installed power: 2,800–3,200 PS (2,100–2,400 kW; 2,800–3,200 bhp) (diesels); 750 PS (550 kW; 740 shp) (electric)
- Propulsion: 2 shafts; 2 × diesel engines; 2 × electric motors.
- Speed: 17.7 knots (32.8 km/h; 20.4 mph) surfaced; 7.6 knots (14.1 km/h; 8.7 mph) submerged
- Range: 8,500 nmi (15,700 km; 9,800 mi) at 10 knots (19 km/h; 12 mph) surfaced; 80 nmi (150 km; 92 mi) at 4 knots (7.4 km/h; 4.6 mph) submerged
- Test depth: 230 m (750 ft); Crush depth: 250–295 m (820–968 ft)
- Complement: 4 officers, 40–56 enlisted
- Armament: 5 × 53.3 cm (21 in) torpedo tubes (four bow, one stern); 14 × torpedoes or 26 TMA mines; 1 × 8.8 cm (3.46 in) deck gun (220 rounds); 2 × twin 2 cm (0.79 in) C/30 anti-aircraft guns

Service record
- Part of: 8th U-boat Flotilla; 21 April – 30 November 1943; 6th U-boat Flotilla; 1 – 31 December 1943; 11th U-boat Flotilla; 1 January – 31 August 1944; 13th U-boat Flotilla; 1 September 1944 – 8 May 1945
- Identification codes: M 13 550
- Commanders: Kptlt. Kurt-Heinz Nicolay; 21 April 1943 – 1 December 1944; Oblt.z.S. Friedrich-Georg Herrle; 2 December 1944 – 31 January 1945; Oblt.z.S. Jürgen von Gaza; 1 February – 9 May 1945
- Operations: 8 patrols: 1st patrol: a. 23 January – 4 February 1944; b. 7 – 29 February 1944; 2nd patrol: 15 March – 12 April 1944; 3rd patrol: 29 April – 13 May 1944; 4th patrol: 7 September – 2 October 1944; 5th patrol: a. 17 October – 8 November 1944; b. 5 – 8 December 1944; 6th patrol: a. 14 December 1944 – 4 January 1945; b. 7 – 10 March 1945; 7th patrol: 12 March – 9 April 1945; 8th patrol: a. 16 April – 8 May 1945; b. 9 May 1945; c. 12 May 1945; d. 15 – 19 May 1945
- Victories: None

German submarine U-312 was a Type VIIC U-boat of Nazi Germany's Kriegsmarine during World War II. The submarine was laid down on 10 April 1942 at the Flender Werke yard at Lübeck as yard number 312, launched on 27 February 1943 and commissioned on 21 April under the command of Oberleutnant zur See Kurt-Heinz Nicolay.

During her career, the U-boat sailed on eight combat patrols, but sank no ships. She surrendered on 9 May 1945 and was sunk as part of Operation Deadlight on 29 November 1945.

She was a member of eight wolfpacks.

== Design ==
German Type VIIC submarines were preceded by the shorter Type VIIB submarines. U-312 had a displacement of 769 tonnes (757 long tons) when at the surface and 871 tonnes (857 long tons) while submerged. She had a total length of 67.10 m (220 ft 2 in), a pressure hull length of 50.50 m (165 ft 8 in), a beam of 6.20 m (20 ft 4 in), a height of 9.60 m (31 ft 6 in), and a draught of 4.74 m (15 ft 7 in). The submarine was powered by two Germaniawerft F46 four-stroke, six-cylinder supercharged diesel engines producing a total of 2,800 to 3,200 metric horsepower (2,060 to 2,350 kW; 2,760 to 3,160 shp) for use while surfaced, two Garbe, Lahmeyer & Co. RP 137/c double-acting electric motors producing a total of 750 metric horsepower (550 kW; 740 shp) for use while submerged. She had two shafts and two 1.23 m (4 ft) propellers. The boat was capable of operating at depths of up to 230 metres (750 ft).

The submarine had a maximum surface speed of 17.7 knots (32.8 km/h; 20.4 mph) and a maximum submerged speed of 7.6 knots (14.1 km/h; 8.7 mph). When submerged, the boat could operate for 80 nautical miles (150 km; 92 mi) at 4 knots (7.4 km/h; 4.6 mph); when surfaced, she could travel 8,500 nautical miles (15,700 km; 9,800 mi) at 10 knots (19 km/h; 12 mph). U-312 was fitted with five 53.3 cm (21 in) torpedo tubes (four fitted at the bow and one at the stern), fourteen torpedoes, one 8.8 cm (3.46 in) SK C/35 naval gun, 220 rounds, and two twin 2 cm (0.79 in) C/30 anti-aircraft guns. The boat had a complement of between forty-four and sixty.

== Service history ==
After training with the 8th U-boat Flotilla, U-312 was transferred to the 6th flotilla, for front-line service on 1 December 1943. She made the short voyage from Kiel in Germany to Bergen in Norway in the first half of January 1944.

=== First, second and third patrols ===
She left Bergen on 23 January 1944 and travelled through the north Norwegian Sea and southwest of Bear Island, arriving in Hammerfest on 29 February.

Her second patrol was similar to the first, sailing through the Norwegian, Greenland and Barents Seas. She docked at Narvik on 12 April 1944.

The boat sortied for a third time from Narvik on 29 April 1944. She arrived back at that port on 13 May and moved to Trondheim.

=== Fourth and fifth patrols ===
Her fourth foray was relatively uneventful, starting and finishing in Narvik.

The submarine's fifth patrol was only notable for clearing the North Cape and passing east of Murmansk.

=== Sixth, seventh and eighth patrols ===
Patrol number six was slightly different in that it took her as far as the northern Scottish coast, arriving there on 24 December 1944.

The boat was now based at Kilbotn, from whence she sailed on her seventh and eighth patrols.

=== Surrender and fate ===
Following the German capitulation, U-312 was moved, first from Kilbotn to Narvik, then to Skjomenfjord before arriving at Loch Eriboll in Scotland on 19 May 1945 in preparation for Operation Deadlight. She was finally transferred to Lisahally and sunk on 29 November by the guns of HMS Onslow.

== Bibliography ==
- Busch, Rainer; Röll, Hans-Joachim (1999). German U-boat commanders of World War II : a biographical dictionary. Translated by Brooks, Geoffrey. London, Annapolis, Md: Greenhill Books, Naval Institute Press. ISBN 1-55750-186-6.
- Busch, Rainer; Röll, Hans-Joachim (1999). Der U-Boot-Krieg, 1939-1945: Deutsche U-Boot-Verluste von September 1939 bis Mai 1945 [German U-boat losses from September 1939 to May 1945] (in German). Vol. IV. Hamburg, Berlin, Bonn: Mittler. ISBN 3-8132-0514-2.
- Gröner, Erich; Jung, Dieter; Maass, Martin (1991). U-boats and Mine Warfare Vessels. German Warships 1815–1945. Vol. 2. Translated by Thomas, Keith; Magowan, Rachel. London: Conway Maritime Press. ISBN 0-85177-593-4.
