= German submarine U-626 =

German World War II submarine

History

Nazi Germany
- Name: U-626
- Ordered: 15 August 1940
- Builder: Blohm & Voss, Hamburg
- Yard number: 602
- Laid down: 28 July 1941
- Launched: 15 April 1942
- Commissioned: 11 June 1942
- Fate: Missing since 14 December 1942

General characteristics
- Class & type: Type VIIC submarine
- Displacement: 769 tonnes (757 long tons) surfaced; 871 t (857 long tons) submerged
- Length: 67.10 m (220 ft 2 in) o/a; 50.50 m (165 ft 8 in) pressure hull
- Beam: 6.20 m (20 ft 4 in) o/a; 4.70 m (15 ft 5 in) pressure hull
- Height: 9.60 m (31 ft 6 in)
- Draught: 4.74 m (15 ft 7 in)
- Installed power: 2,800–3,200 PS (2,100–2,400 kW; 2,800–3,200 bhp) (diesels); 750 PS (550 kW; 740 shp) (electric)
- Propulsion: 2 shafts; 2 × diesel engines; 2 × electric motors
- Speed: 17.7 knots (32.8 km/h; 20.4 mph) surfaced; 7.6 knots (14.1 km/h; 8.7 mph) submerged
- Range: 8,500 nmi (15,700 km; 9,800 mi) at 10 knots (19 km/h; 12 mph) surfaced; 80 nmi (150 km; 92 mi) at 4 knots (7.4 km/h; 4.6 mph) submerged
- Test depth: 230 m (750 ft); Crush depth: 250–295 m (820–968 ft)
- Complement: 4 officers, 40–56 enlisted
- Armament: 5 × 53.3 cm (21 in) torpedo tubes (four bow, one stern); 14 × torpedoes or 26 TMA mines; 1 × 8.8 cm (3.46 in) deck gun (220 rounds); 1 x 2 cm (0.79 in) C/30 AA gun

Service record
- Part of: 5th U-boat Flotilla; 11 June – 31 October 1942; 6th U-boat Flotilla; 1 November – 14 December 1942
- Identification codes: M 07 089
- Commanders: Lt.z.S.d.R. Hans-Botho Bade; 11 June – 14 December 1942
- Operations: 1 patrol: 8 – 14 December 1942
- Victories: None

German submarine U-626 was a Type VIIC U-boat of Nazi Germany's Kriegsmarine during World War II. The ship was built by Blohm & Voss of Hamburg, and commissioned on 11 June 1942. After six months of basic training she was assigned to the 6th U-boat Flotilla. U-626 sailed from Bergen on 8 December 1942 on her first operational voyage. She was reported missing on 16 December after failing to report her position.

== Design ==
German Type VIIC submarines were preceded by the shorter Type VIIB submarines. U-626 had a displacement of 769 tonnes (757 long tons) when at the surface and 871 tonnes (857 long tons) while submerged. She had a total length of 67.10 m (220 ft 2 in), a pressure hull length of 50.50 m (165 ft 8 in), a beam of 6.20 m (20 ft 4 in), a height of 9.60 m (31 ft 6 in), and a draught of 4.74 m (15 ft 7 in). The submarine was powered by two Germaniawerft F46 four-stroke, six-cylinder supercharged diesel engines producing a total of 2,800 to 3,200 metric horsepower (2,060 to 2,350 kW; 2,760 to 3,160 shp) for use while surfaced, two Brown, Boveri & Cie GG UB 720/8 double-acting electric motors producing a total of 750 metric horsepower (550 kW; 740 shp) for use while submerged. She had two shafts and two 1.23 m (4 ft) propellers. The boat was capable of operating at depths of up to 230 metres (750 ft).

The submarine had a maximum surface speed of 17.7 knots (32.8 km/h; 20.4 mph) and a maximum submerged speed of 7.6 knots (14.1 km/h; 8.7 mph). When submerged, the boat could operate for 80 nautical miles (150 km; 92 mi) at 4 knots (7.4 km/h; 4.6 mph); when surfaced, she could travel 8,500 nautical miles (15,700 km; 9,800 mi) at 10 knots (19 km/h; 12 mph). U-626 was fitted with five 53.3 cm (21 in) torpedo tubes (four fitted at the bow and one at the stern), fourteen torpedoes, one 8.8 cm (3.46 in) SK C/35 naval gun, 220 rounds, and a 2 cm (0.79 in) C/30 anti-aircraft gun. The boat had a complement of between 44 and 60.

== Service history ==
U-626 was assigned to the 5th U-boat Flotilla for basic training, and upon completion was permanently assigned to the 5th U-boat Flotilla. On 8 December 1942, U-626, under the direction of Leutnant zur See (acting sub-lieutenant/ensign) Hans-Botho Bade left Bergen, Norway for her maiden patrol. On 14 December 1942, U-626 sent her final radio message at position 58°40′N 20°00′W and was never heard from again. 47 men were lost with her.

== Previously recorded fate ==
U-626 was previously thought to have been sunk in the North Atlantic on 15 December 1942 by depth charges from US Coast Guard cutter USCGC Ingham. This attack was actually 200 nmi from U-626's position and there is no evidence that the target was a U-boat.

== Bibliography ==
- Busch, Rainer; Röll, Hans-Joachim (1999). German U-boat commanders of World War II : a biographical dictionary. Translated by Brooks, Geoffrey. London, Annapolis, Md: Greenhill Books, Naval Institute Press. ISBN 1-55750-186-6.
- Busch, Rainer; Röll, Hans-Joachim (1999). Der U-Boot-Krieg, 1939-1945: Deutsche U-Boot-Verluste von September 1939 bis Mai 1945 [German U-boat losses from September 1939 to May 1945] (in German). Vol. IV. Hamburg, Berlin, Bonn: Mittler. ISBN 3-8132-0514-2.
- Gröner, Eric; Jung, Dieter; Maass, Martin (1991). German Warships 1815-1945: U-boats and Mine Warfare Vessels. Vol. 2. Translated by Thomas, Keith; Magowan, Rachel. London: Conway Maritime Press. ISBN 0-85177-593-4.
