= German submarine U-363 =

German World War II submarine

Coordinates: 55°45′N 8°18′W

History

Nazi Germany
- Name: U-363
- Ordered: 20 January 1941
- Builder: Flensburger Schiffbau-Gesellschaft, Flensburg
- Yard number: 482
- Laid down: 23 December 1941
- Launched: 17 December 1942
- Commissioned: 18 March 1943
- Fate: Surrendered on 9 May 1945 at Narvik. Sunk on 31 December 1945 as part of Operation Deadlight

General characteristics
- Class & type: Type VIIC submarine
- Displacement: 769 tonnes (757 long tons) surfaced; 871 t (857 long tons) submerged
- Length: 67.10 m (220 ft 2 in) o/a; 50.50 m (165 ft 8 in) pressure hull
- Beam: 6.20 m (20 ft 4 in) o/a; 4.70 m (15 ft 5 in) pressure hull
- Height: 9.60 m (31 ft 6 in)
- Draught: 4.74 m (15 ft 7 in)
- Installed power: 2,800–3,200 PS (2,100–2,400 kW; 2,800–3,200 bhp) (diesels); 750 PS (550 kW; 740 shp) (electric)
- Propulsion: 2 shafts; 2 × diesel engines; 2 × electric motors
- Speed: 17.7 knots (32.8 km/h; 20.4 mph) surfaced; 7.6 knots (14.1 km/h; 8.7 mph) submerged
- Range: 8,500 nmi (15,700 km; 9,800 mi) at 10 knots (19 km/h; 12 mph) surfaced; 80 nmi (150 km; 92 mi) at 4 knots (7.4 km/h; 4.6 mph) submerged
- Test depth: 230 m (750 ft); Crush depth: 250–295 m (820–968 ft)
- Complement: 4 officers, 40–56 enlisted
- Armament: 5 × 53.3 cm (21 in) torpedo tubes (four bow, one stern); 14 × torpedoes; 1 × 8.8 cm (3.46 in) deck gun (220 rounds); 2 × twin 2 cm (0.79 in) C/30 anti-aircraft guns

Service record
- Part of: 8th U-boat Flotilla; 18 March 1943 – 31 May 1944; 11th U-boat Flotilla; 1 June – 14 September 1944; 13th U-boat Flotilla; 15 September 1944 – 8 May 1945
- Identification codes: M 50 947
- Commanders: Oblt.z.S. Wolf-Werner Wilzer; 18 March – 31 August 1943; Kptlt. Werner Nees; 1 September 1943 – 9 May 1945
- Operations: 7 patrols: 1st patrol: 29 May – 29 June 1944; 2nd patrol: 4 August – 2 September 1944; 3rd patrol: 28 September – 6 October 1944; 4th patrol: 15 October – 11 November 1944; 5th patrol: a. 28 November – 8 December 1944; b. 9 – 12 December 1944; c. 7 – 10 March 1945; 6th patrol: 12 – 31 March 1945; 7th patrol: a. 18 April – 8 May 1945; b. 12 May 1945; c. 15 – 18 May 1945; d. 18 – 19 May 1945
- Victories: None

German submarine U-363 was a Type VIIC U-boat of Nazi Germany's Kriegsmarine during World War II. The submarine was laid down on 23 December 1941 at the Flensburger Schiffbau-Gesellschaft yard at Flensburg as yard number 482, launched on 17 December 1942 and commissioned on 18 March 1943 under the command of Oberleutnant zur See Wolf-Werner Wilzer.

During her career, the U-boat sailed on seven combat patrols, but sank no ships before she surrendered at Narvik on 9 May 1945. She was sunk on 31 December 1945 as part of Operation Deadlight.

She was a member of eight wolfpacks.

== Design ==
German Type VIIC submarines were preceded by the shorter Type VIIB submarines. U-363 had a displacement of 769 tonnes (757 long tons) when at the surface and 871 tonnes (857 long tons) while submerged. She had a total length of 67.10 m (220 ft 2 in), a pressure hull length of 50.50 m (165 ft 8 in), a beam of 6.20 m (20 ft 4 in), a height of 9.60 m (31 ft 6 in), and a draught of 4.74 m (15 ft 7 in). The submarine was powered by two Germaniawerft F46 four-stroke, six-cylinder supercharged diesel engines producing a total of 2,800 to 3,200 metric horsepower (2,060 to 2,350 kW; 2,760 to 3,160 shp) for use while surfaced, two AEG GU 460/8–27 double-acting electric motors producing a total of 750 metric horsepower (550 kW; 740 shp) for use while submerged. She had two shafts and two 1.23 m (4 ft) propellers. The boat was capable of operating at depths of up to 230 metres (750 ft).

The submarine had a maximum surface speed of 17.7 knots (32.8 km/h; 20.4 mph) and a maximum submerged speed of 7.6 knots (14.1 km/h; 8.7 mph). When submerged, the boat could operate for 80 nautical miles (150 km; 92 mi) at 4 knots (7.4 km/h; 4.6 mph); when surfaced, she could travel 8,500 nautical miles (15,700 km; 9,800 mi) at 10 knots (19 km/h; 12 mph). U-363 was fitted with five 53.3 cm (21 in) torpedo tubes (four fitted at the bow and one at the stern), fourteen torpedoes, one 8.8 cm (3.46 in) SK C/35 naval gun, 220 rounds, and two twin 2 cm (0.79 in) C/30 anti-aircraft guns. The boat had a complement of between forty-four and sixty.

== Service history ==
The boat's service life began with training with the 8th U-boat Flotilla on 18 March 1943. She was transferred to the 11th flotilla for operations on 1 June 1944. She was then reassigned to the 13th flotilla on 15 September.

She made a pair of short voyages from Kiel in Germany to Marvika and Bergen in Norway in May 1944.

=== First, second and third patrols ===
The submarine's first patrol began with her departure from Bergen on 29 May 1944. She arrived at Bogenbucht (west of Narvik) on 29 June but departed again on 4 August. She finished her second patrol back at Narvik on 2 September 1944.

U-363 spent her third sortie in the Norwegian Sea.

=== Fourth, fifth and sixth patrols ===
Her fourth foray took her past the North Cape and into the Barents Sea.

For her fifth patrol, she sailed as far as the Kola Inlet, (the entrance to Murmansk).

Patrol number six was preceded by trips between Narvik, Trondheim and Kilbotn, (northwest of Narvik).

=== Seventh patrol and fate ===
U-363's last patrol in April and May 1945 was followed by moves to Skjomenfjord and following the German capitulation, Lerwick and Loch Eriboll in Scotland in preparation for Operation Deadlight. She was sunk on 31 December 1945 by the guns of HMS Onslaught and ORP Blyskawica.

== Bibliography ==
- Busch, Rainer; Röll, Hans-Joachim (1999). German U-boat commanders of World War II : a biographical dictionary. Translated by Brooks, Geoffrey. London, Annapolis, Md: Greenhill Books, Naval Institute Press. ISBN 1-55750-186-6.
- Busch, Rainer; Röll, Hans-Joachim (1999). Deutsche U-Boot-Verluste von September 1939 bis Mai 1945 [German U-boat losses from September 1939 to May 1945]. Der U-Boot-Krieg (in German). Vol. IV. Hamburg, Berlin, Bonn: Mittler. ISBN 3-8132-0514-2.
- Gröner, Erich; Jung, Dieter; Maass, Martin (1991). U-boats and Mine Warfare Vessels. German Warships 1815–1945. Vol. 2. Translated by Thomas, Keith; Magowan, Rachel. London: Conway Maritime Press. ISBN 0-85177-593-4.
