= German submarine U-627 =

German World War II submarine

History

Nazi Germany
- Name: U-627
- Ordered: 15 August 1940
- Builder: Blohm & Voss in Hamburg
- Yard number: 603
- Laid down: 8 August 1941
- Launched: 29 April 1942
- Commissioned: 18 June 1942
- Fate: Sunk on 27 October 1942 just south of Iceland in position 59.14°N 22.49°W by depth charges from a British B-17 Flying Fortress bomber.

General characteristics
- Class & type: Type VIIC submarine
- Displacement: 769 tonnes (757 long tons) surfaced; 871 t (857 long tons) submerged
- Length: 67.10 m (220 ft 2 in) o/a; 50.50 m (165 ft 8 in) pressure hull
- Beam: 6.20 m (20 ft 4 in) o/a; 4.70 m (15 ft 5 in) pressure hull
- Height: 9.60 m (31 ft 6 in)
- Draught: 4.74 m (15 ft 7 in)
- Installed power: 2,800–3,200 PS (2,100–2,400 kW; 2,800–3,200 bhp) (diesels); 750 PS (550 kW; 740 shp) (electric)
- Propulsion: 2 shafts; 2 × diesel engines; 2 × electric motors
- Speed: 17.7 knots (32.8 km/h; 20.4 mph) surfaced; 7.6 knots (14.1 km/h; 8.7 mph) submerged
- Range: 8,500 nmi (15,700 km; 9,800 mi) at 10 knots (19 km/h; 12 mph) surfaced; 80 nmi (150 km; 92 mi) at 4 knots (7.4 km/h; 4.6 mph) submerged
- Test depth: 230 m (750 ft); Crush depth: 250–295 m (820–968 ft)
- Complement: 4 officers, 40–56 enlisted
- Armament: 5 × 53.3 cm (21 in) torpedo tubes (four bow, one stern); 14 × torpedoes or 26 TMA mines; 1 × 8.8 cm (3.46 in) deck gun (220 rounds); 1 x 2 cm (0.79 in) C/30 AA gun

Service record
- Part of: 5th U-boat Flotilla; 18 June – 1 October 1942; 6th U-boat Flotilla; 1 – 27 October 1942
- Identification codes: M 07 218
- Commanders: Kptlt. Robert Kindelbacher; 18 June – 27 October 1942
- Operations: 1 patrol: 15 – 27 October 1942
- Victories: None

German submarine U-627 was a Type VIIC U-boat built for Nazi Germany's Kriegsmarine for service during World War II. Its hull was laid down on 8 August 1941 at the yards of Blohm & Voss in Hamburg and it was commissioned on 18 June 1942 under the command of Kapitänleutnant Robert Kindelbacher.

U-627 was sunk on 27 October 1942 just south of Iceland in position 59.14°N 22.49°W by depth charges from a British B-17 Flying Fortress bomber from 206 Squadron RAF. This resulted in the loss of all 44 crew members.

== Design ==
German Type VIIC submarines were preceded by the shorter Type VIIB submarines. U-627 had a displacement of 769 tonnes (757 long tons) when at the surface and 871 tonnes (857 long tons) while submerged. She had a total length of 67.10 m (220 ft 2 in), a pressure hull length of 50.50 m (165 ft 8 in), a beam of 6.20 m (20 ft 4 in), a height of 9.60 m (31 ft 6 in), and a draught of 4.74 m (15 ft 7 in). The submarine was powered by two Germaniawerft F46 four-stroke, six-cylinder supercharged diesel engines producing a total of 2,800 to 3,200 metric horsepower (2,060 to 2,350 kW; 2,760 to 3,160 shp) for use while surfaced, two BBC GG UB 720/8 double-acting electric motors producing a total of 750 metric horsepower (550 kW; 740 shp) for use while submerged. She had two shafts and two 1.23 m (4 ft) propellers. The boat was capable of operating at depths of up to 230 metres (750 ft).

The submarine had a maximum surface speed of 17.7 knots (32.8 km/h; 20.4 mph) and a maximum submerged speed of 7.6 knots (14.1 km/h; 8.7 mph). When submerged, the boat could operate for 80 nautical miles (150 km; 92 mi) at 4 knots (7.4 km/h; 4.6 mph); when surfaced, she could travel 8,500 nautical miles (15,700 km; 9,800 mi) at 10 knots (19 km/h; 12 mph). U-627 was fitted with five 53.3 cm (21 in) torpedo tubes (four fitted at the bow and one at the stern), fourteen torpedoes, one 8.8 cm (3.46 in) SK C/35 naval gun, 220 rounds, and a 2 cm (0.79 in) C/30 anti-aircraft gun. The boat had a complement of between forty-four and sixty.

== Patrol and loss ==
U-627 departed Kiel on 15 October 1942 bound for the North Atlantic via the Norwegian coastline and the gap between Iceland and the Faroe Islands. She was at sea for only 13 days before being spotted South by Southwest of Iceland by a B-17 patrol bomber of 206 Squadron RAF - FL457/F, piloted by Pilot Officer R.L. Cowey - and sunk with depth charges, in position 59.14°N 22.49°W with a loss of all 44 men aboard.

== Bibliography ==
- Busch, Rainer; Röll, Hans-Joachim (1999). German U-boat commanders of World War II : a biographical dictionary. Translated by Brooks, Geoffrey. London, Annapolis, Md: Greenhill Books, Naval Institute Press. ISBN 1-55750-186-6.
- Busch, Rainer; Röll, Hans-Joachim (1999). Der U-Boot-Krieg, 1939-1945: Deutsche U-Boot-Verluste von September 1939 bis Mai 1945 [German U-boat losses from September 1939 to May 1945] (in German). Vol. IV. Hamburg, Berlin, Bonn: Mittler. ISBN 3-8132-0514-2.
- Gröner, Eric; Jung, Dieter; Maass, Martin (1991). German Warships 1815-1945: U-boats and Mine Warfare Vessels. Vol. 2. Translated by Thomas, Keith; Magowan, Rachel. London: Conway Maritime Press. ISBN 0-85177-593-4.
- Niestle, Axel (1998). German U-Boat Losses During World War II. United States Naval Institute. ISBN 1-55750-641-8.
