= German submarine U-737 =

German World War II submarine

History

Nazi Germany
- Name: U-737
- Ordered: 10 April 1941
- Builder: Schichau-Werke, Danzig
- Yard number: 1534
- Laid down: 14 February 1942
- Launched: 21 November 1942
- Commissioned: 30 January 1943
- Fate: Sunk on 19 December 1944

General characteristics
- Class & type: Type VIIC submarine
- Displacement: 769 tonnes (757 long tons) surfaced; 871 t (857 long tons) submerged
- Length: 67.10 m (220 ft 2 in) o/a; 50.50 m (165 ft 8 in) pressure hull
- Beam: 6.20 m (20 ft 4 in) o/a; 4.70 m (15 ft 5 in) pressure hull
- Height: 9.60 m (31 ft 6 in)
- Draught: 4.74 m (15 ft 7 in)
- Installed power: 2,800–3,200 PS (2,100–2,400 kW; 2,800–3,200 bhp) (diesels); 750 PS (550 kW; 740 shp) (electric)
- Propulsion: 2 shafts; 2 × diesel engines; 2 × electric motors
- Speed: 17.7 knots (32.8 km/h; 20.4 mph) surfaced; 7.6 knots (14.1 km/h; 8.7 mph) submerged
- Range: 8,500 nmi (15,700 km; 9,800 mi) at 10 knots (19 km/h; 12 mph) surfaced; 80 nmi (150 km; 92 mi) at 4 knots (7.4 km/h; 4.6 mph) submerged
- Test depth: 230 m (750 ft); Crush depth: 250–295 m (820–968 ft)
- Complement: 4 officers, 40–56 enlisted
- Armament: 5 × 53.3 cm (21 in) torpedo tubes (four bow, one stern); 14 × torpedoes; 1 × 8.8 cm (3.46 in) deck gun (220 rounds); 2 × twin 2 cm (0.79 in) C/30 anti-aircraft guns

Service record
- Part of: 8th U-boat Flotilla; 30 January – 30 June 1943; 13th U-boat Flotilla; 1 July 1943 – 19 December 1944
- Identification codes: M 49 907
- Commanders: Oblt.z.S. Wolfgang Poeschel; 30 January – 4 February 1943; Kptlt. Paul Brasack; 5 February 1943 – 24 November 1944; Oblt.z.S. Friedrich-August Greus; 25 November – 19 December 1944
- Operations: 9 patrols: 1st patrol: 8 August – 20 September 1943; 2nd patrol: a. 4 – 23 October 1943; b. 24 October 1943; c. 27 – 29 October 1943; d. 13 – 15 January 1944; 3rd patrol: a. 16 January – 10 February 1944; b. 11 – 12 February 1944; c. 28 – 29 February 1944; 4th patrol: a. 1 – 8 March 1944; b. 9 – 12 March 1944; c. 2 – 4 May 1944; d. 8 May 1944; 5th patrol: a. 13 May – 7 June 1944; b. 11 – 12 June 1944; c. 14 – 18 June 1944; 6th patrol: a. 24 June – 9 July 1944; b. 15 – 17 July 1944; c. 16 – 21 September 1944; d. 22 September 1944; 7th patrol: 24 September – 3 October 1944; 8th patrol: a. 12 – 24 October 1944; b. 25 – 31 October 1944; 9th patrol: 13 – 19 December 1944
- Victories: None

German submarine U-737 was a Type VIIC U-boat of Nazi Germany's Kriegsmarine built for service during World War II. Her keel was laid down on 14 February 1942 by Schichau-Werke of Danzig. She was commissioned on 30 January 1943 with Oberleutnant zur See Wolfgang Poeschel in command.

== Design ==
German Type VIIC submarines were preceded by the shorter Type VIIB submarines. U-737 had a displacement of 769 tonnes (757 long tons) when at the surface and 871 tonnes (857 long tons) while submerged. She had a total length of 67.10 m (220 ft 2 in), a pressure hull length of 50.50 m (165 ft 8 in), a beam of 6.20 m (20 ft 4 in), a height of 9.60 m (31 ft 6 in), and a draught of 4.74 m (15 ft 7 in). The submarine was powered by two Germaniawerft F46 four-stroke, six-cylinder supercharged diesel engines producing a total of 2,800 to 3,200 metric horsepower (2,060 to 2,350 kW; 2,760 to 3,160 shp) for use while surfaced, two AEG GU 460/8–27 double-acting electric motors producing a total of 750 metric horsepower (550 kW; 740 shp) for use while submerged. She had two shafts and two 1.23 m (4 ft) propellers. The boat was capable of operating at depths of up to 230 metres (750 ft).

The submarine had a maximum surface speed of 17.7 knots (32.8 km/h; 20.4 mph) and a maximum submerged speed of 7.6 knots (14.1 km/h; 8.7 mph). When submerged, the boat could operate for 80 nautical miles (150 km; 92 mi) at 4 knots (7.4 km/h; 4.6 mph); when surfaced, she could travel 8,500 nautical miles (15,700 km; 9,800 mi) at 10 knots (19 km/h; 12 mph). U-737 was fitted with five 53.3 cm (21 in) torpedo tubes (four fitted at the bow and one at the stern), fourteen torpedoes, one 8.8 cm (3.46 in) SK C/35 naval gun, 220 rounds, and two twin 2 cm (0.79 in) C/30 anti-aircraft guns. The boat had a complement of between forty-four and sixty.

== Service history ==
The boat was attacked twice by aircraft while on active service. Once early in 1944, by a RAF British Liberator aircraft. She managed to damage the plane with anti-aircraft fire, which had to abort the attack and was forced to make a belly landing because of damage sustained. In later 1944, the U-boat was attacked by a Soviet plane, three crew were injured, before she dived.

=== Wolfpacks ===
U-737 took part in eight wolfpacks, namely:

- Monsun (4 – 22 October 1943)
- Isegrim (16 – 27 January 1944)
- Werwolf (27 January – 9 February 1944)
- Taifun (5 – 7 March 1944)
- Trutz (2 – 6 June 1944)
- Feuer (17 – 19 September 1944)
- Grimm (24 September – 2 October 1944)
- Panther (16 – 23 October 1944)

== Fate ==
While on active duty under the command of Oberleutnant zur See Friedrich-August Greus, U-737 sank at 00:18 on 19 December 1944 in the Vestfjorden, in position 68°09′N 15°39′E. She had collided with German depot ship, MRS 25. 31 crew died, with 20 survivors.

== Bibliography ==
- Busch, Rainer; Röll, Hans-Joachim (1999). German U-boat commanders of World War II : a biographical dictionary. Translated by Brooks, Geoffrey. London, Annapolis, Md: Greenhill Books, Naval Institute Press. ISBN 1-55750-186-6.
- Busch, Rainer; Röll, Hans-Joachim (1999). Der U-Boot-Krieg, 1939-1945: Deutsche U-Boot-Verluste von September 1939 bis Mai 1945 [German U-boat losses from September 1939 to May 1945] (in German). Vol. IV. Hamburg, Berlin, Bonn: Mittler. ISBN 3-8132-0514-2.
- Gröner, Eric; Jung, Dieter; Maass, Martin (1991). German Warships 1815-1945: U-boats and Mine Warfare Vessels. Vol. 2. Translated by Thomas, Keith; Magowan, Rachel. London: Conway Maritime Press. ISBN 0-85177-593-4.
