= German submarine U-313 =

German World War II submarine

Coordinates: 55°40′N 8°24′W

History

Nazi Germany
- Name: U-313
- Ordered: 25 August 1941
- Builder: Flender Werke, Lübeck
- Yard number: 313
- Laid down: 11 May 1942
- Launched: 27 March 1943
- Commissioned: 20 May 1943
- Fate: Surrendered on 9 May 1945. Sunk on 27 December 1945 as part of Operation Deadlight

General characteristics
- Class & type: Type VIIC submarine
- Displacement: 769 tonnes (757 long tons) surfaced; 871 t (857 long tons) submerged
- Length: 67.10 m (220 ft 2 in) o/a; 50.50 m (165 ft 8 in) pressure hull
- Beam: 6.20 m (20 ft 4 in) o/a; 4.70 m (15 ft 5 in) pressure hull
- Height: 9.60 m (31 ft 6 in)
- Draught: 4.74 m (15 ft 7 in)
- Installed power: 2,800–3,200 PS (2,100–2,400 kW; 2,800–3,200 bhp) (diesels); 750 PS (550 kW; 740 shp) (electric)
- Propulsion: 2 shafts; 2 × diesel engines; 2 × electric motors.
- Speed: 17.7 knots (32.8 km/h; 20.4 mph) surfaced; 7.6 knots (14.1 km/h; 8.7 mph) submerged
- Range: 8,500 nmi (15,700 km; 9,800 mi) at 10 knots (19 km/h; 12 mph) surfaced; 80 nmi (150 km; 92 mi) at 4 knots (7.4 km/h; 4.6 mph) submerged
- Test depth: 230 m (750 ft); Crush depth: 250–295 m (820–968 ft)
- Complement: 4 officers, 40–56 enlisted
- Armament: 5 × 53.3 cm (21 in) torpedo tubes (four bow, one stern); 14 × torpedoes or 26 TMA mines; 1 × 8.8 cm (3.46 in) deck gun (220 rounds); 2 × twin 2 cm (0.79 in) C/30 anti-aircraft guns

Service record
- Part of: 8th U-boat Flotilla; 20 May – 31 December 1943; 11th U-boat Flotilla; 1 January – 14 September 1944; 13th U-boat Flotilla; 15 September 1944 – 8 May 1945
- Identification codes: M 44 826
- Commanders: Kptlt. Friedrich Schweiger; 20 May 1943 – 9 May 1945
- Operations: 12 patrols: 1st patrol: a. 26 January – 2 February 1944; b. 7 – 29 February 1944; 2nd patrol: 15 March – 13 April 1944; 3rd patrol: 25 April – 12 May 1944; 4th patrol: 30 May – 3 July 1944; 5th patrol: 6 – 14 September 1944; 6th patrol: 20 – 23 September 1944; 7th patrol: 26 September – 3 November 1944; 8th patrol: 23 November – 6 December 1944; 9th patrol: 11 – 16 December 1944; 10th patrol: 23 December 1944 – 17 February 1945; 11th patrol: 16 – 29 March 1945; 12th patrol: a. 17 April – 8 May 1945; b. 12 May 1945; c. 15 – 19 May 1945
- Victories: None

German submarine U-313 was a Type VIIC U-boat of Nazi Germany's Kriegsmarine during World War II. The submarine was laid down on 11 May 1942 at the Flender Werke yard at Lübeck as yard number 313, launched on 27 March 1943 and commissioned on 20 May under the command of Kapitänleutnant Friedrich Schweiger.

During her career, the U-boat sailed on twelve combat patrols, but sank no ships before she surrendered at Narvik on 9 May 1945. She was sunk on 27 December 1945 as part of Operation Deadlight.

She was a member of eleven wolfpacks.

== Design ==
German Type VIIC submarines were preceded by the shorter Type VIIB submarines. U-313 had a displacement of 769 tonnes (757 long tons) when at the surface and 871 tonnes (857 long tons) while submerged. She had a total length of 67.10 m (220 ft 2 in), a pressure hull length of 50.50 m (165 ft 8 in), a beam of 6.20 m (20 ft 4 in), a height of 9.60 m (31 ft 6 in), and a draught of 4.74 m (15 ft 7 in). The submarine was powered by two Germaniawerft F46 four-stroke, six-cylinder supercharged diesel engines producing a total of 2,800 to 3,200 metric horsepower (2,060 to 2,350 kW; 2,760 to 3,160 shp) for use while surfaced, two Garbe, Lahmeyer & Co. RP 137/c double-acting electric motors producing a total of 750 metric horsepower (550 kW; 740 shp) for use while submerged. She had two shafts and two 1.23 m (4 ft) propellers. The boat was capable of operating at depths of up to 230 metres (750 ft).

The submarine had a maximum surface speed of 17.7 knots (32.8 km/h; 20.4 mph) and a maximum submerged speed of 7.6 knots (14.1 km/h; 8.7 mph). When submerged, the boat could operate for 80 nautical miles (150 km; 92 mi) at 4 knots (7.4 km/h; 4.6 mph); when surfaced, she could travel 8,500 nautical miles (15,700 km; 9,800 mi) at 10 knots (19 km/h; 12 mph). U-313 was fitted with five 53.3 cm (21 in) torpedo tubes (four fitted at the bow and one at the stern), fourteen torpedoes, one 8.8 cm (3.46 in) SK C/35 naval gun, 220 rounds, and two twin 2 cm (0.79 in) C/30 anti-aircraft guns. The boat had a complement of between forty-four and sixty.

== Service history ==
The boat's service life began with training with the 8th U-boat Flotilla in May 1943. She was transferred to the 11th flotilla for operations on 1 January 1944. She was then reassigned to the 13th flotilla on 15 September.

She made a pair of short voyages from Kiel in Germany to Stavanger and Bergen in Norway in January 1944.

=== First, second and third patrols ===
The submarine's first patrol began with her departure from Bergen on 26 January 1944. She arrived at Hammerfest on 2 February but departed again on the seventh. She finished the patrol at Hammerfest on the 29th.

U-313 spent her second and third patrols in the Norwegian Sea.

=== Fourth, fifth, sixth and seventh patrols ===
Her fourth sortie took her as far as a point southwest of Bear Island. On 26 June 1944, she was north of Jan Mayen Island.

The boat's fifth patrol kept her closer to the Norwegian coast.

Her sixth and seventh patrols saw the submarine docking in Skillefjord on 23 September 1944, having left Narvik on the 20th. She then left the smaller port on the 26th and returned to Narvik.

=== Eighth, ninth and tenth patrols ===
For her eighth sortie, she rounded the North Cape, passing Murmansk.

Her ninth patrol was relatively short, beginning in Bodenbucht on 11 December 1944, (northwest of Narvik) and terminating in Trondheim on the 16th.

If her previous patrol was brief, her tenth effort, at 57 days, was her longest and involved sailing near to the Orkney Islands. Having departed Trondheim, the boat returned to Narvik.

=== Eleventh and twelfth patrols and fate ===
Having used Harstad (northwest of Narvik) briefly and following the German capitulation, U-313 was moved, first from Narvik to Skjomenfjord, then to Loch Eriboll in Scotland on 19 May 1945 in preparation for Operation Deadlight. She was finally transferred to Loch Ryan and sunk on 27 November. According to one source, she capsized while under tow by HMS Blencathra.

== Bibliography ==
- Busch, Rainer; Röll, Hans-Joachim (1999). German U-boat commanders of World War II : a biographical dictionary. Translated by Brooks, Geoffrey. London, Annapolis, Md: Greenhill Books, Naval Institute Press. ISBN 1-55750-186-6.
- Busch, Rainer; Röll, Hans-Joachim (1999). Der U-Boot-Krieg, 1939-1945: Deutsche U-Boot-Verluste von September 1939 bis Mai 1945 [German U-boat losses from September 1939 to May 1945] (in German). Vol. IV. Hamburg, Berlin, Bonn: Mittler. ISBN 3-8132-0514-2.
- Gröner, Erich; Jung, Dieter; Maass, Martin (1991). U-boats and Mine Warfare Vessels. German Warships 1815–1945. Vol. 2. Translated by Thomas, Keith; Magowan, Rachel. London: Conway Maritime Press. ISBN 0-85177-593-4.
