= German submarine U-237 =

German World War II submarine

History

Nazi Germany
- Name: U-237
- Ordered: 20 January 1941
- Builder: Germaniawerft, Kiel
- Yard number: 667
- Laid down: 23 April 1942
- Launched: 17 December 1942
- Commissioned: 30 January 1943
- Fate: Sunk by American bombs in Kiel during a raid on 14 May 1943, but was raised, repaired and returned to service.; Sunk a second time by British bombs at the Deutsche Werke in Kiel on 4 April 1945.

General characteristics
- Class & type: Type VIIC submarine
- Displacement: 769 tonnes (757 long tons) surfaced; 871 t (857 long tons) submerged
- Length: 67.10 m (220 ft 2 in) o/a; 50.50 m (165 ft 8 in) pressure hull
- Beam: 6.20 m (20 ft 4 in) o/a; 4.70 m (15 ft 5 in) pressure hull
- Height: 9.60 m (31 ft 6 in)
- Draught: 4.74 m (15 ft 7 in)
- Installed power: 2,800–3,200 PS (2,100–2,400 kW; 2,800–3,200 bhp) (diesels); 750 PS (550 kW; 740 shp) (electric)
- Propulsion: 2 shafts; 2 × diesel engines; 2 × electric motors.
- Speed: 17.7 knots (32.8 km/h; 20.4 mph) surfaced; 7.6 knots (14.1 km/h; 8.7 mph) submerged
- Range: 8,500 nmi (15,700 km; 9,800 mi) at 10 knots (19 km/h; 12 mph) surfaced; 80 nmi (150 km; 92 mi) at 4 knots (7.4 km/h; 4.6 mph) submerged
- Test depth: 230 m (750 ft); Crush depth: 250–295 m (820–968 ft)
- Complement: 4 officers, 40–56 enlisted
- Armament: 5 × 53.3 cm (21 in) torpedo tubes (four bow, one stern); 14 × G7e torpedoes or 26 TMA mines; 1 × 8.8 cm (3.46 in) deck gun(220 rounds); 1 x 2 cm (0.79 in) C/30 AA gun

Service record
- Part of: 5th U-boat Flotilla; 30 January – 26 May 1943; 23rd U-boat Flotilla; 8 October 1943 – 28 February 1945; 31st U-boat Flotilla; 1 March – 4 April 1945
- Identification codes: M 49 758
- Commanders: Oblt.z.S. / Kptlt. Hubert Nordheimer; 31 January – 26 May 1943; Lt.z.S. / Oblt.z.S. Lothar König; 8 October 1943 – September 1944; Obtlt.z.S.d.R. Johannes van Stipriaan; September – October 1944; Kptlt. Karl-Heinz Menard; October 1944 – 4 April 1945
- Operations: None
- Victories: None

German submarine U-237 was a Type VIIC U-boat of Nazi Germany's Kriegsmarine during World War II.

The submarine was laid down on 23 April 1942 at the Friedrich Krupp Germaniawerft yard at Kiel as yard number 667, launched on 17 December and commissioned on 30 January 1943 under the command of Oberleutnant zur See Hubert Nordheimer. After training with the 5th U-boat Flotilla at Kiel, she went to the 23rd flotilla as a trials boat and then to the 31st flotilla. She was sunk by American bombs at the Germaniawerft in Kiel during a raid on 14 May 1943, but was raised, repaired and returned to service. She was sunk a second time by British bombs at the Deutsche Werke in Kiel on 4 April 1945.

== Design ==
German Type VIIC submarines were preceded by the shorter Type VIIB submarines. U-237 had a displacement of 769 tonnes (757 long tons) when at the surface and 871 tonnes (857 long tons) while submerged. She had a total length of 67.10 m (220 ft 2 in), a pressure hull length of 50.50 m (165 ft 8 in), a beam of 6.20 m (20 ft 4 in), a height of 9.60 m (31 ft 6 in), and a draught of 4.74 m (15 ft 7 in). The submarine was powered by two Germaniawerft F46 four-stroke, six-cylinder supercharged diesel engines producing a total of 2,800 to 3,200 metric horsepower (2,060 to 2,350 kW; 2,760 to 3,160 shp) for use while surfaced, two AEG GU 460/8-276 double-acting electric motors producing a total of 750 metric horsepower (550 kW; 740 shp) for use while submerged. She had two shafts and two 1.23 m (4 ft) propellers. The boat was capable of operating at depths of up to 230 metres (750 ft).

The submarine had a maximum surface speed of 17.7 knots (32.8 km/h; 20.4 mph) and a maximum submerged speed of 7.6 knots (14.1 km/h; 8.7 mph). When submerged, the boat could operate for 80 nautical miles (150 km; 92 mi) at 4 knots (7.4 km/h; 4.6 mph); when surfaced, she could travel 8,500 nautical miles (15,700 km; 9,800 mi) at 10 knots (19 km/h; 12 mph). U-237 was fitted with five 53.3 cm (21 in) torpedo tubes (four fitted at the bow and one at the stern), fourteen torpedoes, one 8.8 cm (3.46 in) SK C/35 naval gun, 220 rounds, and a 2 cm (0.79 in) C/30 anti-aircraft gun. The boat had a complement of between forty-four and sixty.

== Bibliography ==
- Busch, Rainer; Röll, Hans-Joachim (1999). German U-boat commanders of World War II : a biographical dictionary. Translated by Brooks, Geoffrey. London, Annapolis, Md: Greenhill Books, Naval Institute Press. ISBN 1-55750-186-6.
- Busch, Rainer; Röll, Hans-Joachim (1999). Deutsche U-Boot-Verluste von September 1939 bis Mai 1945 [German U-boat losses from September 1939 to May 1945]. Der U-Boot-Krieg (in German). Vol. IV. Hamburg, Berlin, Bonn: Mittler. ISBN 3-8132-0514-2.
- Gröner, Erich; Jung, Dieter; Maass, Martin (1991). U-boats and Mine Warfare Vessels. German Warships 1815–1945. Vol. 2. Translated by Thomas, Keith; Magowan, Rachel. London: Conway Maritime Press. ISBN 0-85177-593-4.
