= HMS LST-305 =

LST-1-class landing ship tank

Coordinates: 41.233333°N 12.516667°E

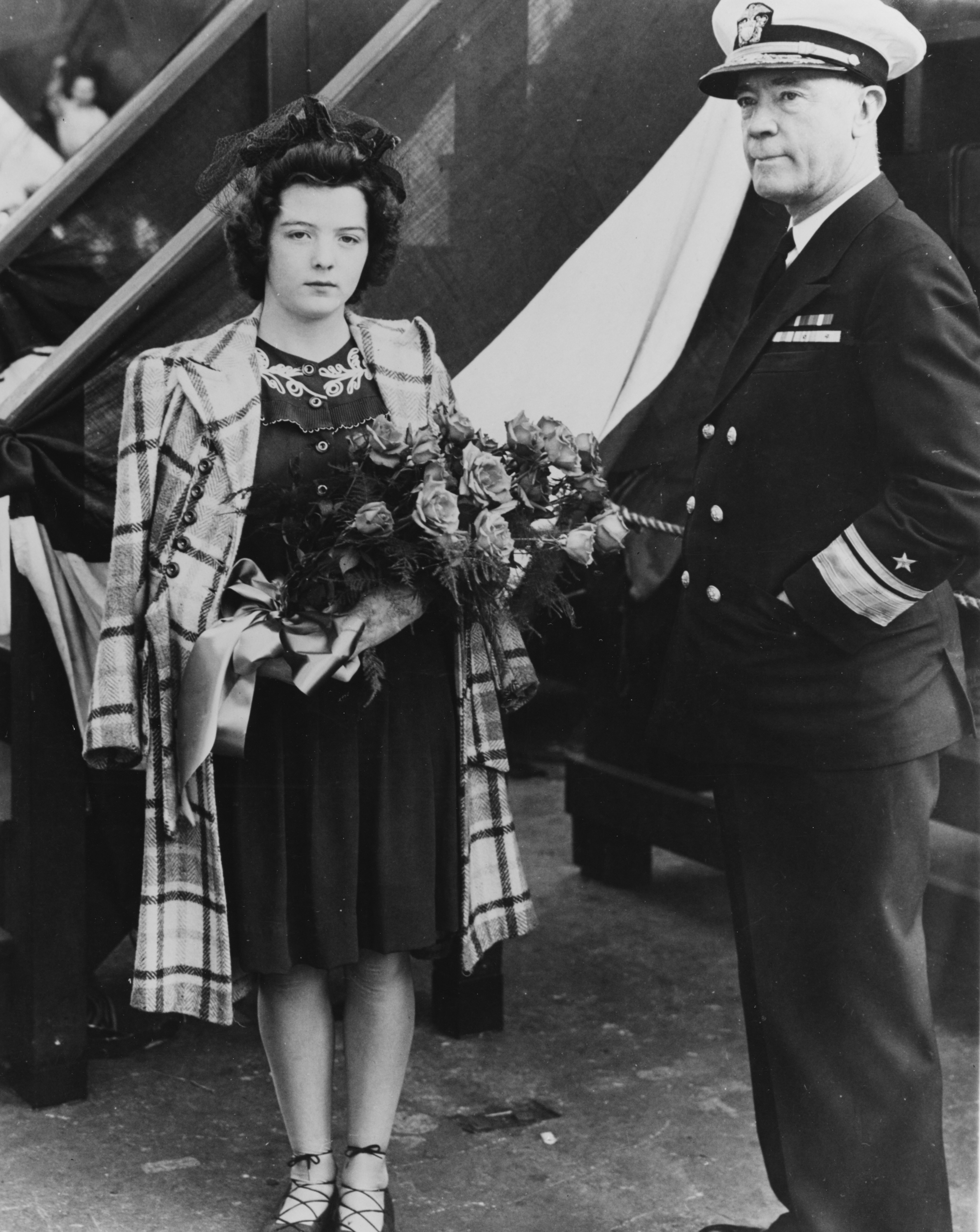
- Launching ceremony of LST-305

History

United Kingdom
- Name: LST-305
- Builder: Boston Navy Yard, Boston
- Laid down: 24 July 1942
- Launched: 10 October 1942
- Sponsored by: Mrs. Lillian R. Earley
- Commissioned: 7 December 1942
- Decommissioned: 16 May 1944
- Fate: Sunk, 20 February 1944

General characteristics
- Class & type: LST-1-class tank landing ship
- Displacement: 4,080 long tons (4,145 t) full load; 2,160 long tons (2,190 t) landing
- Length: 328 ft (100 m) oa
- Beam: 50 ft (15 m)
- Draft: Full load: 8 ft 2 in (2.49 m) forward; 14 ft 1 in (4.29 m) aft; Landing at 2,160 t: 3 ft 11 in (1.19 m) forward; 9 ft 10 in (3.00 m) aft
- Installed power: 2 × 900 hp (670 kW) Electro-Motive Diesel 12-567A diesel engines; 1,700 shp (1,300 kW)
- Propulsion: 1 × Falk main reduction gears; 2 × Propellers
- Speed: 12 kn (22 km/h; 14 mph)
- Range: 24,000 nmi (44,000 km; 28,000 mi) at 9 kn (17 km/h; 10 mph) while displacing 3,960 long tons (4,024 t)
- Boats & landing craft carried: 2 or 6 x LCVPs
- Capacity: 2,100 tons oceangoing maximum; 350 tons main deckload
- Troops: 16 officers, 147 enlisted men
- Complement: 13 officers, 104 enlisted men
- Armament: Varied, ultimate armament; 2 × twin 40 mm (1.57 in) Bofors guns; 4 × single 40 mm Bofors guns; 12 × 20 mm (0.79 in) Oerlikon cannons

HMS LST-305 was a LST-1-class tank landing ship in the Royal Navy during World War II.

== Construction and career ==
LST-305 was laid down on 24 July 1942, at Boston Navy Yard, Boston, Massachusetts. Launched on 10 October 1942, and commissioned into the Royal Navy on 7 December 1942.

During World War II, LST-305 was assigned to the Europe-Africa-Middle theater. She took part in the Sicilian occupation in Italy, from 9 to 15 July 1943 and 28 July to 17 August 1943. Then the Salerno landings from 9 to 21 September, of the same year.

On 20 February 1944, she was struck by a torpedo fired by the German submarine U-230 while taking part in Operation Shingle, near Anzio, in which she later sank the next day.

She was struck from the Navy Register on 16 May 1944.

== Sources ==
- United States. Dept. of the Treasury (1962). Treasury Decisions Under the Customs, Internal Revenue, Industrial Alcohol, Narcotic and Other Laws, Volume 97. U.S. Government Printing Office.
- Moore, Capt. John (1984). Jane's Fighting Ships 1984-85. Jane's Information Group. ISBN 978-0710607959.
- Saunders, Stephen (2009). Jane's Fighting Ships 2009-2010. Jane's Information Group. ISBN 978-0710628886.
- Fairplay International Shipping Journal Volume 222. United Kingdom: Fairplay Publishing Limited. 1967.
