= Arethusa-class cruiser (1934) =

Class of Royal Navy light cruisers

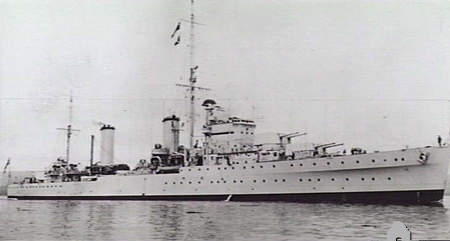
- HMS Galatea as completed, at Devonport, c. 1935

Class overview
- Name: Arethusa class
- Builders: Chatham Dockyard; Harland and Wolff; Portsmouth Dockyard; Scotts Shipbuilding and Eng.
- Operators: Royal Navy; Republic of China Navy; People's Liberation Army Navy
- Preceded by: Leander class
- Succeeded by: Town class; Dido class
- Built: 1933–1937
- In commission: 1935–1949
- Planned: 6
- Completed: 4
- Cancelled: 2
- Lost: 2

General characteristics
- Type: Light cruiser
- Displacement: 5,220 (5,270 Penelope and Aurora) tons standard load; 6,665 (6,715 Penelope and Aurora) tons full load
- Length: 506 ft (154 m)
- Beam: 51 ft (16 m)
- Draught: 16.5 ft (5.0 m)
- Propulsion: Four Parsons geared steam turbines; Four Admiralty 3-drum boilers; Four shafts; 64,000 shp (48,000 kW)
- Speed: 32.25 knots (59.73 km/h; 37.11 mph)
- Range: 5,300 nmi (9,800 km; 6,100 mi) at 13 kn (24 km/h; 15 mph); 1,325 tons fuel oil
- Complement: 500
- Armament: 6 × BL 6 in (152 mm) Mk. XXIII guns in twin mounts Mk. XXI; 4 × QF 4 in (102 mm) Mk. V guns in single mounts HA Mk. III (Arethusa, Galatea); 8 × QF 4 in (102 mm) Mk. XVI guns in twin mounts HA/LA Mk. XIX (Aurora, Penelope); 8 × 0.5 in (12.7 mm) Mk. III Vickers machine guns in quad mounts Mk. III; 6 × 21-inch (533 mm) torpedo tubes (2 × 3)
- Armour: 1–3 in magazine box protection; 2.25 in belt; 1 in deck, turrets and bulkheads
- Aircraft carried: 1 × Hawker Osprey, then Fairey Seafox, except Aurora; removed by end 1941.

The Arethusa class was a class of four light cruisers built for the Royal Navy between 1933 and 1937 and that served in World War II. It had been intended to construct six ships, but the last pair, Polyphemus and Minotaur, were ordered in 1934 as the 9,100-ton Town-class Southampton and Newcastle.

== Design ==
The design was led by Charles Lillicrap, RCNC. The Arethusas were a smaller version of the Amphion group of the earlier Leander class, having the unit machinery layout and two funnels of the former. The design was judged to be the minimum required for a "trade route cruiser" to counter the threat of the auxiliary cruiser over which, even with their reduced armament, they would enjoy a comfortable superiority. They were also to be capable of acting as a fleet cruiser (which was fortunate because, in the end, they were used almost exclusively with the fleet). Therefore, no reduction in speed (i.e. machinery) could be accepted, and savings had to be found in armament, size and protection; the Arethusas suppressed 'X' 6-inch gun turret and were 50 feet (15 m) shorter and displaced 1,250 tons less than the Leanders. The protection scheme was the same as the Leanders but was generally thinner to save weight. This allowed six Arethusas to be built for every five Leanders within the constraints of tonnage allowed under treaties then in force. Following from Charles Lillicrap's detailed studies, welded construction was widely used for the first time to save weight, over 250 tons being cut off the original specification.

They were armed with six BL 6 inch Mark XXIII in three twin mountings Mark XXI in 'A', 'B' and 'Y' positions. Triple 21-inch (530 mm) torpedo tubes were carried abreast the after funnel, the reduction in beam had reduced training space resulting in the omission of one tube vis-à-vis the Leanders. The secondary armament was four QF 4-inch Mark V on single mountings HA Mark III, controlled by a HACS director on the bridge. The 4-inch magazine was retained in the position of the Leander class well forward, but the guns themselves were moved well aft. As a result, the 4-inch shell and charge had to be transported 200 feet (61 m) along the ship to reach the guns. In Penelope and Aurora eight QF 4-inch Mark XVI on four twin mountings HA/LA Mark XIX replaced the single mounts, and a second HACS director was added aft. A shelter was added for the gun crews between each pair of guns as it was recognised that in wartime the crews would spend a lot of time closed up at action stations and would rapidly fatigue in the open gun mountings. Galatea received similar alteration before the outbreak of war. The light armament consisted of eight 0.5-inch Vickers machine guns in two quadruple mountings.

A rotating catapult for a float plane and a derrick were fitted between the funnels. It had been intended to carry a second aircraft aft, but in the end this never happened. Aurora completed without aircraft facilities, and had a deckhouse for accommodation in lieu for service as commodore.

== Modifications ==
Aurora received an unrotated projectile (UP) mounting and eight QF 2-pounder Mark VIII in two quadruple mountings Mark VII in the summer of 1940. Radar Type 284 was added to the main armament director for taking ranges and bearings, and Type 280 air warning at the mastheads was added in April 1941. In August of the same year she received six single 20 mm Oerlikons and two quadruple 0.5-inch machine guns. In 1943 she received Radar Type 282 on the 2-pounder "pom-pom directors".

Galatea had extra plating added amidships after completion to reduce wetness and to protect the boats. She landed her catapult during a refit between October 1940 and January 1941, when she received two quadruple 2-pounders and eight single 20 mm Oerlikons, as well as Type 279 air warning radar added at the mastheads.

Arethusa had received two quadruple 2 pounders and radar by April 1941, and landed the catapult. Later the same year, two UP mountings and four single 20 mm Oerlikons were added. The former were removed in the spring of 1942, as were the single 4 in mountings (replaced by twins as per her sisters) and a further four 20 mm Oerlikons added. Radar Type 286 air warning was landed and radars Type 273 centimetric target indication, Type 281 air warning, Type 282 on the 2-pounder directors, Type 284 on the main armament director and Type 285 on the HACS directors were fitted. Three additional 20 mm Oerlikons were added by October 1942. Between March and December 1943, while under repair in the United States, the 2 pdr were supplanted by quadruple 40 mm Bofors mountings Mark II, three single Oerlikons by four twin power-operated mounts Mark V and had the radar fit modernised.

Penelope also lost her catapult and had two quadruple 2-pounders fitted between August 1940 and July 1941. Four single Oerlikons were added at the end of 1941, and four more in the summer of 1942.

By the end of the war, the surviving ships had around 700 tons of extra equipment added.

== Service ==
The Arethusas proved to be very satisfactory in service, and their hull was adapted for the Dido class of 1937. All had a very active war, especially in the Mediterranean; the two that were lost were torpedoed while working close inshore. Arethusa had a narrow escape in November 1942 when she was hit by an air-dropped torpedo. She caught fire, had two of her three turrets out of action and was badly flooded. However, she survived to be repaired at Charleston in the United States.

== Ships ==
Construction data
Ship	Pennant number	Builder	Laid down	Launched	Completed	Fate
Arethusa	26	Chatham Royal Dockyard	25 January 1933	6 March 1934	21 May 1935	Sold for scrap, 1950
Galatea	71	Scotts, Greenock	2 June 1933	9 August 1934	3 September 1935	Torpedoed by U-557, 15 December 1941
Penelope	97	Harland & Wolff, Belfast	30 May 1934	15 October 1935	12 November 1936	Torpedoed by U-410, 18 February 1944
Aurora	12	Portsmouth Royal Dockyard	23 July 1935	20 August 1936	8 November 1937	Transferred to Nationalist China as Chungking 1948, defected to Communist China as Tchoungking 1949, Huang He 1951, Pei Ching 1951, Kuang Chou 1958, later hulked
Minotaur	—N/a	—N/a	—N/a	—N/a	—N/a	Ordered as Town-class cruisers
Polyphemus	—N/a	—N/a	—N/a	—N/a	—N/a	Ordered as Town-class cruisers

== See also ==
- ARA La Argentina, based on the Arethusa design
- List of ship classes of the Second World War
