= German submarine U-612 =

German World War II submarine

Coordinates: 54.1833°N 12.0833°E

History

Nazi Germany
- Name: U-612
- Ordered: 15 August 1940
- Builder: Blohm & Voss, Hamburg
- Yard number: 588
- Laid down: 21 April 1941
- Launched: 9 January 1942
- Commissioned: 5 March 1942
- Recommissioned: 31 May 1943
- Fate: Rammed and sunk by U-444 on 6 August 1942; Scuttled on 1 May 1945

General characteristics
- Class & type: Type VIIC submarine
- Displacement: 769 tonnes (757 long tons) surfaced; 871 t (857 long tons) submerged
- Length: 67.10 m (220 ft 2 in) o/a; 50.50 m (165 ft 8 in) pressure hull
- Beam: 6.20 m (20 ft 4 in) o/a; 4.70 m (15 ft 5 in) pressure hull
- Height: 9.60 m (31 ft 6 in)
- Draught: 4.74 m (15 ft 7 in)
- Installed power: 2,800–3,200 PS (2,100–2,400 kW; 2,800–3,200 bhp) (diesels); 750 PS (550 kW; 740 shp) (electric)
- Propulsion: 2 shafts; 2 × diesel engines; 2 × electric motors
- Speed: 17.7 knots (32.8 km/h; 20.4 mph) surfaced; 7.6 knots (14.1 km/h; 8.7 mph) submerged
- Range: 8,500 nmi (15,700 km; 9,800 mi) at 10 knots (19 km/h; 12 mph) surfaced; 80 nmi (150 km; 92 mi) at 4 knots (7.4 km/h; 4.6 mph) submerged
- Test depth: 230 m (750 ft); Crush depth: 250–295 m (820–968 ft)
- Complement: 4 officers, 40–56 enlisted
- Armament: 5 × 53.3 cm (21 in) torpedo tubes (four bow, one stern); 14 × torpedoes or 26 TMA mines; 1 × 8.8 cm (3.46 in) deck gun (220 rounds); 1 x 2 cm (0.79 in) C/30 AA gun

Service record
- Part of: 5th U-boat Flotilla; 5 March – 6 August 1942; 24th U-boat Flotilla; 31 May 1943 – 28 February 1945; 31st U-boat Flotilla; 1 March – 1 May 1945
- Identification codes: M 42 940
- Commanders: Kptlt. Paul Siegmann; 5 March – 6 August 1942; Oblt.z.S. Theodor Petersen; 31 May 1943 – 20 February 1944; Oblt.z.S. Hans-Peter Dick; 21 February 1944 – 1 May 1945
- Operations: None
- Victories: None

German submarine U-612 was a Type VIIC U-boat built for Nazi Germany's Kriegsmarine for service during World War II. She was ordered on 15 August 1940 and laid down at Blohm & Voss, Hamburg, on 21 April 1941. She was launched on 9 January 1942 and commissioned 5 March 1942 Oberleutnant zur See Paul Siegmann was her first commanding officer. He was joined in May 1942 by Herbert Werner, author of the book Iron Coffins, as First Officer.

While still on trials in the Baltic U-612 was sunk in collision with U-444 on 6 August 1942. She was later salvaged and served as a training boat until the end of the war, when she was scuttled on 1 May 1945.

== Design ==
German Type VIIC submarines were preceded by the shorter Type VIIB submarines. U-612 had a displacement of 769 tonnes (757 long tons) when at the surface and 871 tonnes (857 long tons) while submerged. She had a total length of 67.10 m (220 ft 2 in), a pressure hull length of 50.50 m (165 ft 8 in), a beam of 6.20 m (20 ft 4 in), a height of 9.60 m (31 ft 6 in), and a draught of 4.74 m (15 ft 7 in). The submarine was powered by two Germaniawerft F46 four-stroke, six-cylinder supercharged diesel engines producing a total of 2,800 to 3,200 metric horsepower (2,060 to 2,350 kW; 2,760 to 3,160 shp) for use while surfaced, two Brown, Boveri & Cie GG UB 720/8 double-acting electric motors producing a total of 750 metric horsepower (550 kW; 740 shp) for use while submerged. She had two shafts and two 1.23 m (4 ft) propellers. The boat was capable of operating at depths of up to 230 metres (750 ft).

The submarine had a maximum surface speed of 17.7 knots (32.8 km/h; 20.4 mph) and a maximum submerged speed of 7.6 knots (14.1 km/h; 8.7 mph). When submerged, the boat could operate for 80 nautical miles (150 km; 92 mi) at 4 knots (7.4 km/h; 4.6 mph); when surfaced, she could travel 8,500 nautical miles (15,700 km; 9,800 mi) at 10 knots (19 km/h; 12 mph). U-612 was fitted with five 53.3 cm (21 in) torpedo tubes (four fitted at the bow and one at the stern), fourteen torpedoes, one 8.8 cm (3.46 in) SK C/35 naval gun, 220 rounds, and a 2 cm (0.79 in) C/30 anti-aircraft gun. The boat had a complement of between forty-four and sixty.

== Service history ==
After commissioning, U-612 was engaged in working up and sea trials in the eastern Baltic, assigned to 5th U-boat Flotilla and based at Königsberg. On 6 August 1942 she was at sea off Danzig when she was accidentally rammed by U-444. Werner describes the event in his book; he states neither boat was aware of the other and that the captain of U-444 was unaware he had struck U-612. He describes in detail the struggle to get out of the rapidly sinking U-boat, and the crew's rescue by two other U-boats, one of which he states was the hapless U-444. Two men died in the incident.

Siegman and his crew undertook to salvage U-612 and put her back into action; the hull was raised during August but found to be too water-damaged for them to continue. The U-boat was handed over to the dockyard at Danzig, and Seigmann and his crew were reassigned to another boat, U-230.

U-612 completed repairs the following year and was re-commissioned 31 May 1943. However she was deemed unsuitable as a "Front-boat" and was confined to training in the Baltic. On commissioning, under Oblt. T Petersen she joined 24 Flotilla, a training unit. In February 1944 she joined 31 Flotilla, another training unit, under the command of Oblt.z.S. HP Dick.

On 1 May 1945 she was caught at Warnemünde by the advancing Red Army and was scuttled to avoid seizure.

== Sources ==
- Blair, Clay (1996). Hitler's U-Boat War: The Hunters 1939-1942. ISBN 0-304-35260-8.
- Erich Gröner German Warships 1815-1945 Vol II (1990). Conway Maritime Press ISBN 0-85177-593-4
- Kemp, Paul (1997). U-Boats Destroyed, German submarine losses in the World Wars. Arms and Armour. ISBN 1-85409-515-3.
- Niestle, Axel (1998). German U-Boat Losses During World War II. Greenhill. ISBN 1-85367-352-8.
- Herbert Werner Iron Coffins (1969) Cassel & Co. ISBN 0-304-35330-2

== Bibliography ==
- Busch, Rainer; Röll, Hans-Joachim (1999). German U-boat commanders of World War II : a biographical dictionary. Translated by Brooks, Geoffrey. London, Annapolis, Md: Greenhill Books, Naval Institute Press. ISBN 1-55750-186-6.
- Busch, Rainer; Röll, Hans-Joachim (1999). Deutsche U-Boot-Verluste von September 1939 bis Mai 1945 [German U-boat losses from September 1939 to May 1945]. Der U-Boot-Krieg (in German). Vol. IV. Hamburg, Berlin, Bonn: Mittler. ISBN 3-8132-0514-2.
- Gröner, Erich; Jung, Dieter; Maass, Martin (1991). German Warships 1815–1945, U-boats and Mine Warfare Vessels. Vol. 2. Translated by Thomas, Keith; Magowan, Rachel. London: Conway Maritime Press. ISBN 0-85177-593-4.
