= German submarine U-415 =

German type VII C world war II submarine

History

Nazi Germany
- Name: U-415
- Ordered: 15 August 1940
- Builder: Danziger Werft, Danzig
- Yard number: 116
- Laid down: 12 July 1941
- Launched: 9 May 1942
- Commissioned: 5 August 1942
- Fate: Sunk by a mine on 14 July 1944

General characteristics
- Class & type: Type VIIC submarine
- Displacement: 769 tonnes (757 long tons) surfaced; 871 t (857 long tons) submerged
- Length: 67.10 m (220 ft 2 in) o/a; 50.50 m (165 ft 8 in) pressure hull
- Beam: 6.20 m (20 ft 4 in) o/a; 4.70 m (15 ft 5 in) pressure hull
- Height: 9.60 m (31 ft 6 in)
- Draught: 4.74 m (15 ft 7 in)
- Installed power: 2,800–3,200 PS (2,100–2,400 kW; 2,800–3,200 bhp) (diesels); 750 PS (550 kW; 740 shp) (electric)
- Propulsion: 2 shafts; 2 × diesel engines; 2 × electric motors
- Speed: 17.7 knots (32.8 km/h; 20.4 mph) surfaced; 7.6 knots (14.1 km/h; 8.7 mph) submerged
- Range: 8,500 nmi (15,700 km; 9,800 mi) at 10 knots (19 km/h; 12 mph) surfaced; 80 nmi (150 km; 92 mi) at 4 knots (7.4 km/h; 4.6 mph) submerged
- Test depth: 230 m (750 ft); Crush depth: 250–295 m (820–968 ft)
- Complement: 4 officers, 40–56 enlisted
- Armament: 5 × 53.3 cm (21 in) torpedo tubes (four bow, one stern); 14 × torpedoes; 1 × 8.8 cm (3.46 in) deck gun (220 rounds); 2 × twin 2 cm (0.79 in) C/30 anti-aircraft guns

Service record
- Part of: 8th U-boat Flotilla; 5 August 1942 – 28 February 1943; 1st U-boat Flotilla; 1 March 1943 – 14 July 1944
- Identification codes: M 50 314
- Commanders: Kptlt. Kurt Neide; 5 August 1942 – 16 April 1944; Oblt.z.S. Herbert A. Werner; 17 April – 14 July 1944
- Operations: 7 patrols: 1st patrol: 7 March – 5 May 1943; 2nd patrol: 12 June – 8 September 1943; 3rd patrol: 27 October – 2 November 1943; 4th patrol: 21 November 1943 – 6 January 1944; 5th patrol: 2 – 31 March 1944; 6th patrol: 6 – 8 June 1944; 7th patrol: 11 – 13 July 1944
- Victories: 1 merchant ship sunk (4,917 GRT); 1 warship sunk (1,340 tons); 1 merchant ship damaged (5,486 GRT)

German submarine U-415 was a Type VIIC U-boat built for Nazi Germany's Kriegsmarine for service during World War II.

== Design ==
German Type VIIC submarines were preceded by the shorter Type VIIB submarines. U-415 had a displacement of 769 tonnes (757 long tons) when at the surface and 871 tonnes (857 long tons) while submerged. She had a total length of 67.10 m (220 ft 2 in), a pressure hull length of 50.50 m (165 ft 8 in), a beam of 6.20 m (20 ft 4 in), a height of 9.60 m (31 ft 6 in), and a draught of 4.74 m (15 ft 7 in). The submarine was powered by two Germaniawerft F46 four-stroke, six-cylinder supercharged diesel engines producing a total of 2,800 to 3,200 metric horsepower (2,060 to 2,350 kW; 2,760 to 3,160 shp) for use while surfaced, two Siemens-Schuckert GU 343/38–8 double-acting electric motors producing a total of 750 metric horsepower (550 kW; 740 shp) for use while submerged. She had two shafts and two 1.23 m (4 ft) propellers. The boat was capable of operating at depths of up to 230 metres (750 ft).

The submarine had a maximum surface speed of 17.7 knots (32.8 km/h; 20.4 mph) and a maximum submerged speed of 7.6 knots (14.1 km/h; 8.7 mph). When submerged, the boat could operate for 80 nautical miles (150 km; 92 mi) at 4 knots (7.4 km/h; 4.6 mph); when surfaced, she could travel 8,500 nautical miles (15,700 km; 9,800 mi) at 10 knots (19 km/h; 12 mph). U-415 was fitted with five 53.3 cm (21 in) torpedo tubes (four fitted at the bow and one at the stern), fourteen torpedoes, one 8.8 cm (3.46 in) SK C/35 naval gun, 220 rounds, and two twin 2 cm (0.79 in) C/30 anti-aircraft guns. The boat had a complement of between forty-four and sixty.

== Service history ==
U-415 was laid down on 12 July 1941 at the Danziger Werft in Danzig (now Gdańsk, Poland), as yard number 116. She was launched on 9 May 1942 and commissioned on 5 August. She completed seven patrols before being sunk by a mine on 14 July 1944.

Her first commanding officer was Kapitänleutnant Kurt Neide. He took her on five patrols between March 1943 and March 1944. Her second and last CO was Oberleutnant zur See Herbert Werner, who completed two patrols in her between April and July 1944. These patrols were preceded by a trip to Bergen in Norway in February and March 1943.

== First, second and third patrols ==
Her first patrol saw her leave Bergen on 7 March 1943 and took her to an area south of Greenland where she torpedoed, but did not sink, the British ship Wanstead on 21 April. The ship was sailing in ballast, (the coup de grace was administered by U-413). U-415 then sailed for Brest in France, but was attacked west of the Bay of Biscay on 1 May; first by a Handley Page Halifax of No. 502 Squadron RAF and later that the same day by a Whitley from 612 squadron, also RAF. She was damaged, but managed to reach her destination on 5 May.

Her second sortie began in the company of U-159 and U-634. The small flotilla was detected by an RAF Whitley on 14 June 1943 off the northwest coast of Spain, but the aircraft only attacked when the trio dived. No damage was sustained. The boat was also attacked by a corvette off the coast of Trinidad on 24 July, while hunting a convoy.

Her third patrol, beginning on 27 October 1943, was marred by the attack of a Vickers Wellington equipped with a Leigh Light off Cape Ortegal in the Bay of Biscay on 30 October. The aircraft dropped four depth charges which caused enough damage to ensure that the submarine was compelled to return to base. The Wellington was shot down during the action, all six crew members were killed.

== Fourth and fifth patrols ==
Her fourth operational effort was rewarded by the sinking of the "H"-class destroyer HMS Hurricane. U-415 encountered the warship on Christmas Eve (24 December) 1943 northeast of the Azores. Hurricane was damaged by a GNAT acoustic torpedo. Her escorts elected to evacuate the crew and sink the ship the following day. On her return journey U-415 was attacked by a Halifax of 58 squadron, on 5 January 1944. The aircraft dropped six depth charges on the U-boat which returned fire before diving. The submarine reached her home port the following day.

U-415's fifth patrol came to a sudden halt in mid-Atlantic when she was attacked on 16 March 1944 by aircraft and ships escorting convoy CU 17. The boat was severely damaged and returned to Brest on 31 March.

== Sixth and seventh patrols ==
On 17 April Neide handed over command to Oblt. Herbert Werner, U-415's second and final commander.

After completing repairs U-415, with most other U-boats in French ports, was held back from offensive patrolling to form Group Landwirt, an anti-invasion force. U-415 remained idle for some 68 days before being called to action, a not un-typical period for the Landwirt boats and which left the campaign against Allied shipping at a virtual standstill.

U-415 and the Landwirt boats at Brest were finally mobilized on the night of 6/7 June 1944, the evening of the Normandy landings. Seven snorkel-equipped U-boats, and eight boats, including U-415 lacking snorkels, sailed from Brest in two waves. The eight non-snort boats, proceeding on the surface, came under sustained air attack in what was described as the “greatest air/submarine battle of the war”. Four of the Brest boats were destroyed in air attacks over the 24 hours and three others damaged and forced to return to base; Four aircraft were also shot down. U-415 was attacked in the early hours of 7 June by a Leigh light equipped Wellington and severely damaged; she returned to Brest the following day. Werner claims he shot down two attacking aircraft during this action; other sources report the four RAF aircraft lost, but state it is not possible to say which U-boats were responsible.

Following this action BdU directed all non-snort boats to be restricted to defensive patrols outside their base ports. On 11 July U-415 assigned, with U-963, to Group Pirat, a defensive patrol line off Brest to protect incoming and outgoing U-boats. They came under frequent air attack and withdrew after two days.

On 14 July, assigned to similar duty, U-415 struck an air-laid mine (minefield “Jellyfish 5”) off Brest. West of the ports defensive torpedo net at 48°22′N 04°29′W. Two crewmen were killed.

U-415 was raised on 21 July and put in Clemenceau dock, but was a constructive total loss. She was subsequently cannibalized for spare parts to keep other U-boats in service, and scuttled in August 1944 prior to the fall of “Fortress Brest” to the Allied armies. The hull was broken up in 1946.

== Wolfpacks ==
U-415 took part in seven wolfpacks, namely:

- Seeteufel (21 – 30 March 1943)
- Meise (11 – 24 April 1943)
- Coronel (4 – 8 December 1943)
- Coronel 2 (8 – 14 December 1943)
- Coronel 3 (14 – 17 December 1943)
- Borkum (18 – 26 December 1943)
- Preussen (7 – 17 March 1944)

== Aftermath ==
Werner and some of the crew members from U-415 were moved to U-953. Werner survived the war and wrote the best-selling book Iron Coffins.

== Summary of raiding history ==
Date	Ship Name	Nationality	Tonnage (Note: Merchant ship tonnages are in gross register tons. Military vessels are listed by tons displacement.)	Fate
21 April 1943	Ashantian	United Kingdom	4,917	Sunk
21 April 1943	Wanstead	United Kingdom	5,486	Damaged
24 December 1943	HMS Hurricane	Royal Navy	1,340	Damaged, sunk by escorts

== Sources ==
- Blair, Clay (1998). Hitler's U-Boat War: The Hunted 1942-1945. Cassell. ISBN 0-304-35261-6.
- Gröner, Erich; Jung, Dieter; Maass, Martin (1991). U-boats and Mine Warfare Vessels. German Warships 1815–1945. Vol. 2. Translated by Thomas, Keith; Magowan, Rachel. London: Conway Maritime Press. ISBN 0-85177-593-4.
- Kemp, Paul (1999). U-boats destroyed. London: Arms & Armour. ISBN 1-85409-515-3.
  - Niestle, Axel (1998). German U-Boat Losses During World War II. Greenhill. ISBN 1-85367-352-8.
- Alfred Price :Aircraft versus Submarine in Two World Wars (1973, reprint 2004) ISBN 1 84415 091 7

== Bibliography ==
- Busch, Rainer; Röll, Hans-Joachim (1999). German U-boat commanders of World War II : a biographical dictionary. Translated by Brooks, Geoffrey. London, Annapolis, Md: Greenhill Books, Naval Institute Press. ISBN 1-55750-186-6.
- Busch, Rainer; Röll, Hans-Joachim (1999). Deutsche U-Boot-Verluste von September 1939 bis Mai 1945 [German U-boat losses from September 1939 to May 1945]. Der U-Boot-Krieg (in German). Vol. IV. Hamburg, Berlin, Bonn: Mittler. ISBN 3-8132-0514-2.
- Werner, Herbert A. (1969). Iron Coffins. Holt Rinehart Winston.
