= HM LST-418 =

1942 LST-1-class tank landing ship

History

United Kingdom
- Name: LST-418
- Ordered: as a Type S3-M-K2 hull, MCE hull 938
- Builder: Bethlehem-Fairfield Shipyard, Baltimore, Maryland
- Yard number: 2190
- Laid down: 2 November 1942
- Launched: 30 November 1942
- Commissioned: 29 January 1943
- Identification: Hull symbol: LST-418
- Fate: Lost in action, 16 February 1944

General characteristics
- Class & type: LST-1-class tank landing ship
- Displacement: 4,080 long tons (4,145 t) full load; 2,160 long tons (2,190 t) landing
- Length: 328 ft (100 m) oa
- Beam: 50 ft (15 m)
- Draft: Full load: 8 ft 2 in (2.49 m) forward; 14 ft 1 in (4.29 m) aft; Landing at 2,160 t: 3 ft 11 in (1.19 m) forward; 9 ft 10 in (3.00 m) aft
- Installed power: 2 × 900 hp (670 kW) Electro-Motive Diesel 12-567A diesel engines; 1,700 shp (1,300 kW)
- Propulsion: 1 × Falk main reduction gears; 2 × Propellers
- Speed: 12 kn (22 km/h; 14 mph)
- Range: 24,000 nmi (44,000 km; 28,000 mi) at 9 kn (17 km/h; 10 mph) while displacing 3,960 long tons (4,024 t)
- Boats & landing craft carried: 2 or 6 x LCVPs
- Capacity: 2,100 tons oceangoing maximum; 350 tons main deckload
- Troops: 163
- Complement: 117
- Armament: Varied, ultimate armament; 1 × QF 12-pounder 12 cwt naval gun; 6 × 20 mm (0.79 in) Oerlikon cannon; 4 × Fast Aerial Mine (FAM) mounts

HMS LST-418 was a United States Navy LST-1-class tank landing ship that was transferred to the Royal Navy during World War II. As with many of her class, the ship was never named. Instead, she was referred to by her hull designation.

== Construction ==
LST-418 was laid down on 2 November 1942, under Maritime Commission (MARCOM) contract, MC hull 938, by the Bethlehem-Fairfield Shipyard, Baltimore, Maryland; launched 30 November 1942; then transferred to the United Kingdom and commissioned on 29 January 1943.

== Service history ==
LST-418 proceeded south to the Mediterranean and participated in Operation Shingle. She was struck by a Gnat from U-230 at 15:11 on 16 February 1944, eight kilometres (5.0 mi) northwest of Punta Papa, Ponza Island.41°0′N 12°55′E LCI(L)-194 was able to rescue her crew members. LST-418 was struck from the Navy list on 16 May 1944.

== See also ==
- List of United States Navy LSTs

== Notes ==
Citations

== Bibliography ==
Online resources

- "LST-418". Dictionary of American Naval Fighting Ships. Naval History and Heritage Command. 4 August 2015. This article incorporates text from this source, which is in the public domain.
- "Bethlehem-Fairfield, Baltimore MD". www.ShipbuildingHistory.com. 14 August 2008.
- "USS LST-418". NavSource. 1 April 2005.
- Helgason, Guðmundur. "HMS LST-418". German U-boats of WWII - uboat.net.
