= USS PC-558 =

WW2 United States Navy Ship

Coordinates: 38°41′N 13°43′E

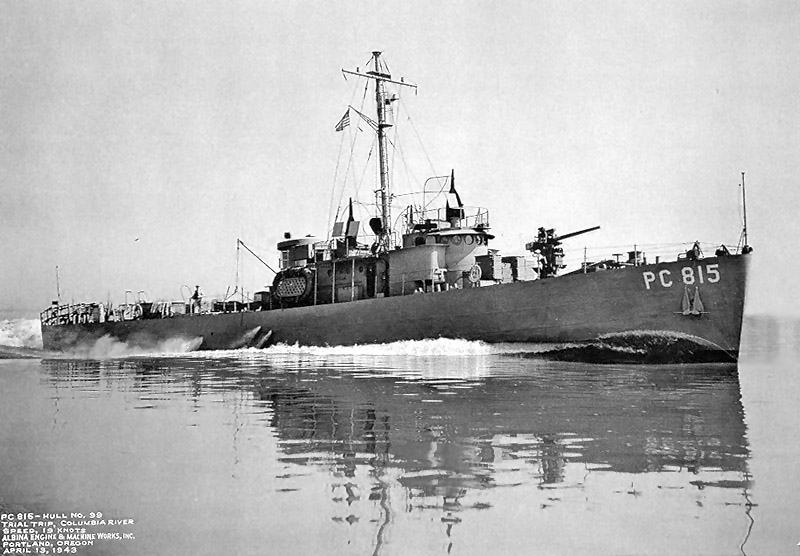
- USS PC-815, a similar PC-416-class submarine chaser

History

United States
- Name: USS PC-558
- Laid down: 31 October 1941
- Launched: 13 September 1942
- Commissioned: 19 November 1942
- Fate: Torpedoed by German U-boat on 9 May 1944
- Stricken: 16 May 1944

General characteristics
- Class & type: PC-461-class submarine chaser
- Displacement: 280 long tons (280 t) (light); 450 long tons (460 t) (full)
- Length: 173 ft 8 in (52.93 m)
- Beam: 23 ft (7.0 m)
- Draft: 10 ft 10 in (3.30 m)
- Installed power: 5,760 bhp (4,300 kW)
- Propulsion: 2 × General Motors 16-258S diesel engines; 1 × Farrel-Birmingham single reduction gear; 2 × shafts
- Speed: 20.2 kn (23.2 mph; 37.4 km/h)
- Complement: 65
- Armament: 1 × 3 in (76 mm)/50 cal dual-purpose gun; 1 × 40 mm gun; 3 × 20 mm cannons; 2 × rocket launchers; 4 × depth charge throwers; 2 × depth charge tracks

USS PC-558 was a PC-461-class submarine chaser built for the United States Navy during World War II. She was sunk by U-230 on 9 May 1944 with the loss of about half of her complement; there were 30 survivors.

== Career ==
PC-558 was laid down on 31 October 1941 by the Luders Marine Construction Co. in Stamford, Connecticut, and launched on 13 September 1942. She was commissioned on 19 November 1942 and assigned to the Atlantic and Mediterranean theater of operations.

On 9 May 1944, PC-558 was patrolling the region north of Palermo, Sicily. Her lookout spotted the Plexiglas dome and tail of a German one-man submarine — a Neger – 3,000 yd (2,700 m) away from the ship. After firing on the Neger with 20 mm and 40 mm cannon fire and dropping two depth charges, PC-558 successfully destroyed the vessel and captured the sole occupant, Oberfähnrich Walter Schulz. PC-558 was later joined by PC-626 and spotted another Neger. After another cannon and depth charge attack, the Neger was destroyed and the occupant was captured alive. PC-558 was later destroyed after being struck by a single torpedo fired by a German U-boat, U-230. A nearby ship — PC-1235 — was fired at three times by the U-boat and all three torpedoes missed their target. PC-1235 drove off U-230 and returned to rescue the thirty surviving crewmembers of PC-558.

== Sources ==
- Photo gallery of USS PC-558 at NavSource Naval History
- USS PC-558 (PC-558)
- Paterson, Lawrence. Weapons of Desperation: German Frogmen and Midget Submarines of World War II, pgs. 21-22
