= HMS Galatea (71) =

1934 Arethusa-class cruiser

Coordinates: 31°17′N 29°13′E

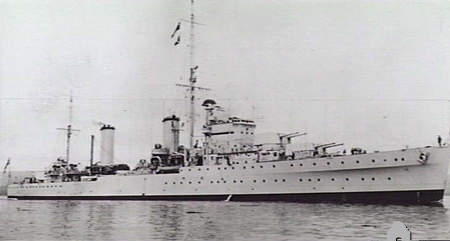
- HMS Galatea as completed, circa. 1935

History

United Kingdom
- Name: HMS Galatea
- Namesake: Galatea
- Builder: Scotts Shipbuilding and Engineering Company, Greenock
- Laid down: 2 June 1933
- Launched: 9 August 1934
- Commissioned: 14 August 1935
- Identification: Pennant number: 71
- Fate: Sunk by U-557 off Alexandria on 14 December 1941

General characteristics
- Class & type: Arethusa-class light cruiser
- Displacement: 5,220 tons standard; 6,665 tons full load
- Length: 506 ft (154 m)
- Beam: 51 ft (16 m)
- Draught: 14 ft (4.3 m)
- Propulsion: Four Parsons geared steam turbines; Four Admiralty 3-drum oil-fired boilers; Four shafts; 64,000 shp
- Speed: 32 knots (59 km/h)
- Range: Unknown; 1,325 tons fuel oil
- Complement: 500
- Armament: Original configuration: 6 × BL 6 inch Mk XXIII naval guns; 4 x 4-inch (102 mm) Mk V single AA guns; 2 x 0.5 in quadruple machine guns; 2 x 21 inch (533 mm) triple torpedo tubes; October 1940 – December 1941 configuration: 3 x 6 in (152 mm) dual guns, 4 x 4 in (102 mm) dual AA guns, 2 x 0.5 in MG quadruple guns, 8 x 20 mm Oerlikon (0.8 in) single guns, 2 x 2-pounder(40 mm) "pom-pom" quad guns, 2 x 21 in (533 mm) triple torpedo tubes.
- Armour: Original configuration: 1 to 3 inches – magazine protection; 2.25 inches – belt; 1 inch – deck, turrets and bulkheads
- Aircraft carried: One aircraft (later removed).

HMS Galatea was an Arethusa-class light cruiser of the Royal Navy. She was built by Scotts Shipbuilding & Engineering Co. (Greenock, Scotland), with the keel being laid down on 2 June 1933. She was launched on 9 August 1934, and commissioned 14 August 1935.

== History ==
Galatea joined the Mediterranean Fleet on commissioning and except the period from March till September 1938 acted as flagship, Rear Admiral (Destroyers). Based in Malta, upon the outbreak of the Spanish Civil War she was active in joint patrols enforcing the non-intervention policy, periodically in co-operation with the German cruiser Deutschland and Italian destroyers. Later deployed in Alexandria, she remained on alert in course of the Italian invasion of Abissynia. In early to mid 1938 the vessel was on refit at Devonport. She was recommissioned for the Mediterranean, deployed at Malta and Alexandria. On 29 March 1939 in Gandia Galatea took on board the leader of the National Defence Council colonel Segismundo Casado and his entourage; the following day she sailed off and on 31 March Casado was transferred to the hospital ship Maine.

After the outbreak of Second World War she was ordered home, and between February and March 1940 she took part in the operations to intercept Axis merchantmen attempting to break out of Vigo. On 4 April 1940, the Polish destroyers Burza, Grom and Błyskawica reached their new homebase Rosyth. In the afternoon they left the harbour with Galatea, her sister ship Arethusa and three destroyers. They were ordered to conduct a patrol in the North Sea and were later ordered to intercept German invasion groups heading for Norway. In April 1940 she was involved in the Norwegian Campaign, leaving on 25 April transporting part of the Norwegian National Treasury to Britain, and in May joined the Nore Command as Flagship of the 2nd Cruiser Squadron. Arriving at Åndalsnes in late April with troops for the Norwegian campaign she returned to Rosyth with 200 crates of gold, weighing 40 kilograms (88 lb) each, from the Norwegian national treasury.

In June 1940 she was involved in the Operation Aerial evacuation of troops from Saint-Jean-de-Luz, France, including Sir Ronald Hugh Campbell, the British Ambassador to France. On 7 September 1940 the code word "Cromwell" was issued meaning that the Germans might land in Kent at dawn. During that night Galatea was sent to patrol the Straits of Dover but made no contact with the enemy. At dawn while returning to port she struck a naval mine off Sheerness and spent three months in dry dock.

She remained with the Home Fleet (under refit, between October 1940 to January 1941) until May 1941, and was involved in hunting the German battleship Bismarck. In July 1941 she joined the Mediterranean Fleet via the Red Sea, and by November was based at Malta with Force "K", operating against the Axis supply convoys to North Africa.

== Fate ==
On 15 December 1941 before midnight Galatea was torpedoed and sunk by the German submarine U-557 off Alexandria, Egypt with the loss of 470 crew. Some 100 survivors were picked up by the destroyers Griffin and Hotspur. Less than 48 hours later, U-557 was rammed by the Italian torpedo boat Orione and sank with all hands.
