= Herbert Werner =

German naval officer (1920–2013)

- Born: 13 May 1920; Freiburg im Breisgau
- Died: 6 April 2013 (aged 92) Vero Beach, Florida, United States
- Allegiance: Nazi Germany
- Branch: Kriegsmarine
- Service years: 1939–1945
- Rank: Oberleutnant zur See
- Commands: U-415, U-953
- Conflicts: Battle of the Atlantic
- Awards: Minesweeper War Badge U-boat War Badge Iron Cross 1st Class

Herbert A. Werner (13 May 1920 – 6 April 2013) was a German submarine officer and captain during World War II. He served in five U-boats and survived the sinking of U-612 in the Baltic and the loss of U-415 in Brest harbour. Werner moved to the United States in 1957 and became an American citizen.

== Biography ==
Herbert Werner was born in Freiburg im Breisgau in 1920. He joined the navy in 1939 as an officer candidate and became a midshipman (Fähnrich zur See) in November 1940. in April 1941 he was appointed watch officer on U-557 under Ottokar Paulshen and carried out three war patrols with her, from April to November 1941, during which he was involved in a number of engagements and took part in the sinking of five merchant ships.

Werner was promoted and sent to U-boat school for training, before joining U-612 in April 1942 as first watch officer under Paul Siegmann. U-612 was lost accidentally in August 1942 while working up, although most of the crew were saved; they were transferred en bloc to U-230. Werner accomplished four patrols with her (seeing only one success) up to December 1943, when he was again promoted and sent to commanders school.

In April 1944 he took command of U-415 but made only two abortive sorties before she was sunk in harbour after detonating a mine. Werner then took command of U-953, in August 1944 and escaped with her to Norway, from whence he made one unfruitful patrol before the German surrender in May 1945.

Werner is thought to have moved to the US in 1957, and there wrote the best selling memoir Iron Coffins. He is believed to have died on 4 (or 6) April 2013 in Vero Beach, Florida.

== Iron coffins ==
"Iron Coffins," is Werner's 1969 memoir of his service in the Kriegsmarine. The book was written based on notes taken by Werner during the war. In the book, Werner claims that the US waged war on German U-Boats in the summer of 1941, prior to the declaration of war. Werner writes that while serving on U-557, during its first patrol, the sub sank seven vessels. Naval historian Jürgen Rohwer reportedly criticized the book's factual accuracy, writing in the January 1970 issue of Schaltung Küste, the journal of the Association of German Submariners, that if its factual errors were marked in red, “it would look like a bloodbath.”

== Sources ==
- Busch, Rainer; Röll, Hans-Joachim (1999b). German U-boat commanders of World War II : a biographical dictionary. Translated by Brooks, Geoffrey. London, Annapolis, Md: Greenhill Books, Naval Institute Press. ISBN 1-55750-186-6.
- Hadley, Michael L. (1995). Count Not the Dead: The Popular Image of the German Submarine. Montreal: McGill-Queen's University Press. ISBN 9780773512825.
