= German submarine U-953 =

German World War II submarine

History

Nazi Germany
- Name: U-953
- Ordered: 10 April 1941
- Builder: Blohm & Voss, Hamburg
- Yard number: 153
- Laid down: 10 February 1942
- Launched: 28 October 1942
- Commissioned: 17 December 1942
- Fate: Surrendered on 9 May 1945; Transferred to United Kingdom on 29 May 1945; Broken up in 1950

General characteristics
- Class & type: Type VIIC submarine
- Displacement: 769 tonnes (757 long tons) surfaced; 871 t (857 long tons) submerged
- Length: 67.10 m (220 ft 2 in) o/a; 50.50 m (165 ft 8 in) pressure hull
- Beam: 6.20 m (20 ft 4 in) o/a; 4.70 m (15 ft 5 in) pressure hull
- Height: 9.60 m (31 ft 6 in)
- Draught: 4.74 m (15 ft 7 in)
- Installed power: 2,800–3,200 PS (2,100–2,400 kW; 2,800–3,200 bhp) (diesels); 750 PS (550 kW; 740 shp) (electric)
- Propulsion: 2 shafts; 2 × diesel engines; 2 × electric motors
- Speed: 17.7 knots (32.8 km/h; 20.4 mph) surfaced; 7.6 knots (14.1 km/h; 8.7 mph) submerged
- Range: 8,500 nmi (15,700 km; 9,800 mi) at 10 knots (19 km/h; 12 mph) surfaced; 80 nmi (150 km; 92 mi) at 4 knots (7.4 km/h; 4.6 mph) submerged
- Test depth: 230 m (750 ft); Crush depth: 250–295 m (820–968 ft)
- Complement: 4 officers, 40–56 enlisted
- Armament: 5 × 53.3 cm (21 in) torpedo tubes (four bow, one stern); 14 × torpedoes or 26 TMA mines; 1 × 8.8 cm (3.46 in) deck gun (220 rounds); 1 × twin 2 cm (0.79 in) C/30 anti-aircraft gun

Service record
- Part of: 5th U-boat Flotilla; 17 December 1942 – 31 May 1943; 3rd U-boat Flotilla; 1 June 1943 – 14 October 1944; 33rd U-boat Flotilla; 15 October 1944 – 8 May 1945
- Identification codes: M 49 558
- Commanders: Oblt.z.S. Karl-Heinz Marbach; 17 December 1942 – August 1944; Oblt.z.S. Herbert A. Werner; August 1944 – April 1945; Oblt.z.S. Erich Steinbrink; April – 9 May 1945
- Operations: 10 patrols: 1st patrol: 13 May – 22 July 1943; 2nd patrol: 2 October – 17 November 1943; 3rd patrol: 26 December 1943 – 20 February 1944; 4th patrol: a. 30 March – 1 April 1944; b. 23 – 26 April 1944; 5th patrol: 22 – 28 May 1944; 6th patrol: 6 – 18 June 1944; 7th patrol: 24 June – 22 July 1944; 8th patrol: a. 10 – 11 August 1944; b. 12 – 19 August 1944; 9th patrol: a. 31 August – 11 October 1944; b. 16 – 25 October 1944; c. 4 – 9 February 1945; d. 12 – 15 February 1945; 10th patrol: a. 21 February – 3 April 1945; b. 6 – 9 April 1945
- Victories: None

German submarine U-953 was a Type VIIC U-boat of Nazi Germany's navy (Kriegsmarine) during World War II.

The submarine was laid down on 10 February 1942 in the Blohm & Voss yard at Hamburg, launched on 28 October 1942, and commissioned on 17 December 1942 under the command of Oberleutnant zur See Karl-Heinz Marbach.

After training with the 5th U-boat Flotilla at Kiel, U-953 was transferred to the 3rd U-boat Flotilla based at La Pallice (in southwestern France), for front-line service on 1 June 1943. She sailed on ten war patrols with no ships sunk. She was transferred to the 33rd U-boat Flotilla on 15 October 1944, under the command of her second skipper, Oberleutnant zur See Herbert Werner, author of the memoir Iron Coffins. U-953 was surrendered at Trondheim in Norway on 9 May 1945.

== Design ==
German Type VIIC submarines were preceded by the shorter Type VIIB submarines. U-953 had a displacement of 769 tonnes (757 long tons) when at the surface and 871 tonnes (857 long tons) while submerged. She had a total length of 67.10 m (220 ft 2 in), a pressure hull length of 50.50 m (165 ft 8 in), a beam of 6.20 m (20 ft 4 in), a height of 9.60 m (31 ft 6 in), and a draught of 4.74 m (15 ft 7 in). The submarine was powered by two Germaniawerft F46 four-stroke, six-cylinder supercharged diesel engines producing a total of 2,800 to 3,200 metric horsepower (2,060 to 2,350 kW; 2,760 to 3,160 shp) for use while surfaced, two Brown, Boveri & Cie GG UB 720/8 double-acting electric motors producing a total of 750 metric horsepower (550 kW; 740 shp) for use while submerged. She had two shafts and two 1.23 m (4 ft) propellers. The boat was capable of operating at depths of up to 230 metres (750 ft).

The submarine had a maximum surface speed of 17.7 knots (32.8 km/h; 20.4 mph) and a maximum submerged speed of 7.6 knots (14.1 km/h; 8.7 mph). When submerged, the boat could operate for 80 nautical miles (150 km; 92 mi) at 4 knots (7.4 km/h; 4.6 mph); when surfaced, she could travel 8,500 nautical miles (15,700 km; 9,800 mi) at 10 knots (19 km/h; 12 mph). U-953 was fitted with five 53.3 cm (21 in) torpedo tubes (four fitted at the bow and one at the stern), fourteen torpedoes, one 8.8 cm (3.46 in) SK C/35 naval gun, 220 rounds, and one twin 2 cm (0.79 in) C/30 anti-aircraft gun. The boat had a complement of between forty-four and sixty.

== Service history ==
=== First patrol ===
U-953 first sailed from Kiel on 13 May 1943, and out into the mid-Atlantic. She had no successes, and on 9 July was attacked by an aircraft, which killed one crewman and wounded two others. The U-boat arrived at La Pallice on 22 July after 71 days on patrol.

=== Second and third patrols ===
U-953's second Atlantic patrol from 2 October until 17 November 1943 was uneventful, but her next, which began on 26 December 1943 and took her to the waters off North Africa, was. On 11 January 1944, as part of the wolfpack Borkum 3, the U-boat fired a T-5 homing torpedo at a corvette, missed, and was then hunted for the next 13 hours by escort ships equipped with depth charges and hedgehogs. She eventually escaped. About 4 February the U-boat approached Convoy ON 222, but was attacked by an unknown Allied aircraft.

=== Fourth to sixth patrols ===
After being fitted with a Schnorchel underwater-breathing apparatus, the U-boat's next three patrols from March to June 1944 were short, from 3 to 13 days and uneventful.

=== Seventh patrol ===
U-953 sailed on 24 June 1944 from Brest into the English Channel.

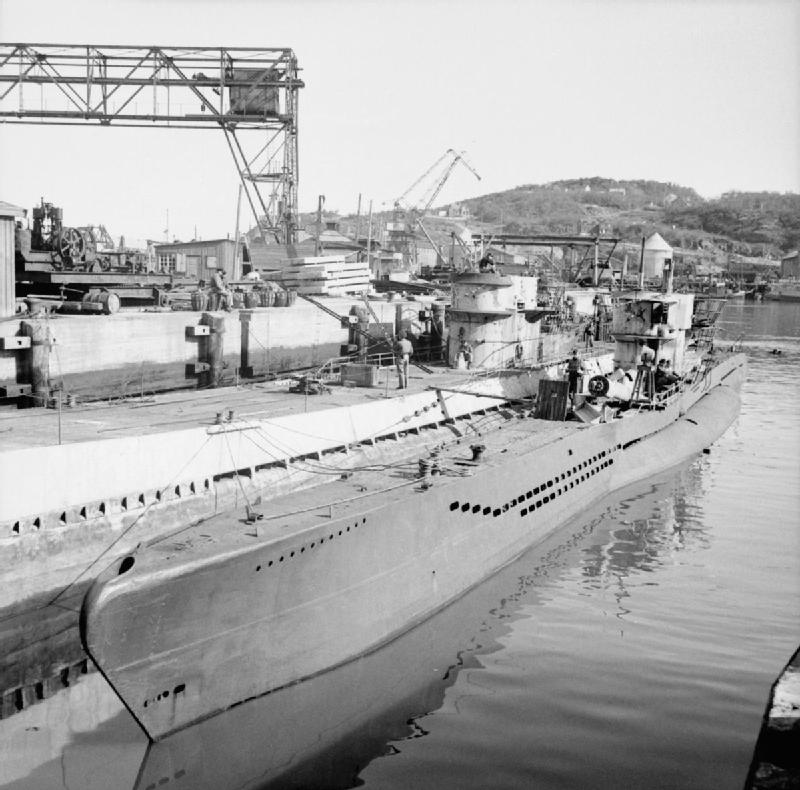
The Campaign in North-west Europe 1944-45 BU6378

=== Eighth to tenth patrols ===
Under her new commander, Oberleutnant zur See Herbert Werner, U-953 sailed from Brest on 12 August 1944, arriving at La Pallice on 19 August.

On 31 August U-953 left La Pallice for Norway, sailing round the Atlantic coast of Ireland. She patrolled the entrance to North Channel for seven days, but has no success. Werner reports a fault on the submarine snorkel caused the patrol to be abandoned and U-953 arrived at Bergen "unannounced" on 11 October.

Faults and a need for overhaul caused her to be sent to Germany, arriving at Flensburg on 25 October. She was not ready for further service until February 1945.

U-953 left Kiel on 4 February 1945, arriving at Kristiansand and then Bergen. On 21 February she left Bergen on an offensive patrol off the coast of Britain but, Werner reports, various faults culminating in a faulty torpedo tube door, forced a return once more. U-953 arrived back in Bergen on 3 April 1945.

Under a new commander, Oberleutnant zur See Erich Steinbrink, she was moved from there to Trondheim on 6 April arriving three days later; there she remained until the German capitulation when she was surrendered to British forces.

=== Wolfpacks ===
U-953 took part in seven wolfpacks, namely:

- Trutz (1 – 16 June 1943)
- Trutz 2 (16 – 29 June 1943)
- Geier 2 (30 June – 15 July 1943)
- Schill (25 October – 16 November 1943)
- Borkum (1 – 3 January 1944)
- Borkum 3 (3 – 13 January 1944)
- Dragoner (22 – 28 May 1944)

=== Fate ===
On 29 May 1945, U-953 sailed to Loch Ryan as a British war prize in August. After trials by the Royal Navy, the U-boat was laid up in Lisahally at the end of the year. On 4 June 1949, U-953 was sold to Clayton & Davie Ltd. of Dunston and broken up for scrap.

== Sources ==
- Bishop, Chris (2006). Kriegsmarine U-Boats 1939–45. London: Amber Books. ISBN 978-1-904687-96-2.
- Blair, Clay (1998). Hitler's U-boat War: The Hunted, 1942-1945. Vol. 2. Cassell. ISBN 0-304-35261-6.
- Busch, Rainer; Röll, Hans-Joachim (1999). German U-boat commanders of World War II : a biographical dictionary. Translated by Brooks, Geoffrey. London, Annapolis, Md: Greenhill Books, Naval Institute Press. ISBN 1-55750-186-6.
- Gröner, Eric; Jung, Dieter; Maass, Martin (1991). German Warships 1815-1945: U-boats and Mine Warfare Vessels. Vol. 2. Translated by Thomas, Keith; Magowan, Rachel. London: Conway Maritime Press. ISBN 0-85177-593-4.
- Neistlé, Axel (2014). German U-Boat Losses during World War II: Details of Destruction (2 ed.). Havertown: Frontline Books (published 30 June 2014).
- Werner, Herbert (1999) [1969]. Iron Coffins. Cassell. ISBN 978-0-3043-5330-9.
