= German submarine U-557 =

German World War II submarine

History

Nazi Germany
- Name: U-557
- Ordered: 25 September 1939
- Builder: Blohm & Voss, Hamburg
- Yard number: 533
- Laid down: 6 January 1940
- Launched: 22 December 1940
- Commissioned: 13 February 1941
- Fate: Sunk on 16 December 1941

General characteristics
- Class & type: Type VIIC submarine
- Displacement: 769 tonnes (757 long tons) surfaced; 871 t (857 long tons) submerged
- Length: 67.10 m (220 ft 2 in) o/a; 50.50 m (165 ft 8 in) pressure hull
- Beam: 6.20 m (20 ft 4 in) o/a; 4.70 m (15 ft 5 in) pressure hull
- Height: 9.60 m (31 ft 6 in)
- Draught: 4.74 m (15 ft 7 in)
- Installed power: 2,800–3,200 PS (2,100–2,400 kW; 2,800–3,200 bhp) (diesels); 750 PS (550 kW; 740 shp) (electric)
- Propulsion: 2 shafts; 2 × diesel engines; 2 × electric motors
- Speed: 17.7 knots (32.8 km/h; 20.4 mph) surfaced; 7.6 knots (14.1 km/h; 8.7 mph) submerged
- Range: 8,500 nmi (15,700 km; 9,800 mi) at 10 knots (19 km/h; 12 mph) surfaced; 80 nmi (150 km; 92 mi) at 4 knots (7.4 km/h; 4.6 mph) submerged
- Test depth: 230 m (750 ft); Crush depth: 250–295 m (820–968 ft)
- Complement: 4 officers, 40–56 enlisted
- Armament: 5 × 53.3 cm (21 in) torpedo tubes (four bow, one stern); 14 × torpedoes or 26 TMA mines; 1 × 8.8 cm (3.46 in) deck gun (220 rounds); 1 x 2 cm (0.79 in) C/30 AA gun

Service record
- Part of: 1st U-boat Flotilla; 13 February – 4 December 1941; 29th U-boat Flotilla; 5 – 16 December 1941
- Identification codes: M 37 961
- Commanders: Oblt.z.S. / K.Kapt. Ottokar Arnold Paulssen; 13 February – 16 December 1941
- Operations: 4 patrols: 1st patrol: 13 May – 10 July 1941; 2nd patrol: a. 13 – 15 August 1941; b. 20 August – 19 September 1941; 3rd patrol: 19 November – 7 December 1941; 4th patrol: 9 – 16 December 1941
- Victories: 6 merchant ships sunk (31,729 GRT); 1 warship sunk (5,220 tons)

German submarine U-557 was a Type VIIC U-boat built for Nazi Germany's Kriegsmarine for service during World War II. She was laid down on 6 January 1940, launched on 22 December 1940 and commissioned on 13 February 1941. Oberleutnant zur See Ottokar Arnold Paulssen was in command throughout her career. For her first three war patrols her 2nd Watch Officer was Herbert Werner, who later wrote the memoir of U-boat service, Iron Coffins. She sank six merchant ships and one warship, a total of 31,729 gross register tons (GRT) and 5,220 tons over four patrols.

She was rammed and sunk by mistake by an Italian torpedo boat on 16 December 1941 west of Crete.

== Design ==
German Type VIIC submarines were preceded by the shorter Type VIIB submarines. U-557 had a displacement of 769 tonnes (757 long tons) when at the surface and 871 tonnes (857 long tons) while submerged. She had a total length of 67.10 m (220 ft 2 in), a pressure hull length of 50.50 m (165 ft 8 in), a beam of 6.20 m (20 ft 4 in), a height of 9.60 m (31 ft 6 in), and a draught of 4.74 m (15 ft 7 in). The submarine was powered by two Germaniawerft F46 four-stroke, six-cylinder supercharged diesel engines producing a total of 2,800 to 3,200 metric horsepower (2,060 to 2,350 kW; 2,760 to 3,160 shp) for use while surfaced, two Brown, Boveri & Cie GG UB 720/8 double-acting electric motors producing a total of 750 metric horsepower (550 kW; 740 shp) for use while submerged. She had two shafts and two 1.23 m (4 ft) propellers. The boat was capable of operating at depths of up to 230 metres (750 ft).

The submarine had a maximum surface speed of 17.7 knots (32.8 km/h; 20.4 mph) and a maximum submerged speed of 7.6 knots (14.1 km/h; 8.7 mph). When submerged, the boat could operate for 80 nautical miles (150 km; 92 mi) at 4 knots (7.4 km/h; 4.6 mph); when surfaced, she could travel 8,500 nautical miles (15,700 km; 9,800 mi) at 10 knots (19 km/h; 12 mph). U-557 was fitted with five 53.3 cm (21 in) torpedo tubes (four fitted at the bow and one at the stern), fourteen torpedoes, one 8.8 cm (3.46 in) SK C/35 naval gun, 220 rounds, and a 2 cm (0.79 in) C/30 anti-aircraft gun. The boat had a complement of between forty-four and sixty.

== Service history ==
=== Emergency in the Baltic ===
U-557 commissioned on 13 February 1941, and was assigned to 1st U-boat flotilla, then based at Kiel. She spent the next four months at Königsberg, working up in the Baltic. During this period she suffered a diving accident, during which one crewman died. Werner describes this incident graphically in his book: He tells us that a routine dive in the Baltic turned into an emergency when the boat sank out of control. She hit the bottom stern-first with a thump. The depth gauge read 142 m (466 ft); the submarine was in severe difficulty, having taken on tons of water, poisonous chlorine gas was leaking from the batteries and there was the danger of an explosion. U-557 had also suffered her first death; a mechanic sustained fatal head injuries in the after torpedo room. A human chain of sailors was formed, passing buckets of sea water to each other, in an attempt to shift some of the weight from the stern to the bow. After many hour's toil, the boat pivoted so that the bow hit the bottom. But the sheer weight of water (about 40 tons) prevented U-557 from reaching the surface. The boat, having exhausted its supply of compressed air, stayed on the sea bed. The crew, under the direction of the Chief Engineer, rocked the boat by moving rapidly from stern to bow and back again. The submarine eventually worked herself free. After 20 hours, U-557 surfaced and sailed on to Kiel.

=== First patrol ===
U-557 departed from Kiel on 13 May 1941 to take up station in the Atlantic. On 24 May her captain was directed to support the sortie by battleship Bismarck and join a five boat patrol line west of the French coast to form a trap for units of the British Home Fleet, which were in pursuit as Bismarck fled towards the French coast.

Despite their efforts the trap failed and Bismarck was attacked and sunk on 27 May. The Home Fleet had been able to track down and destroy Bismarck without hindrance from the U-boat arm.

The trap was dissolved and U-557 was directed to join patrol line West, searching for North Atlantic convoys. However the Bismarck operation had disrupted U-boat operations and only two ships were sunk in the latter two weeks of May; one of these was Empire Storm, sunk by U-557 on 29 May.

On 1 June U-557 re-fuelled from supply ship Belchen; later that same day Belchen was caught and sunk by Royal Navy units engaged in hunting down the Operation Rheinübung supply train.

On 3 June U-557 joined Group West, but the group had no success; this period following the capture of U-110 and the consequent penetration of German Enigma code meant the Allies were able to re-route threatened convoys around areas of known U-boat activity and losses were kept to a minimum.

U 557 abandoned her patrol after six relatively fruitless weeks, arriving at Lorient on 10 July.

=== Second patrol ===
U-557 sailed on her second war patrol on 13 August 1941, though she returned two days later (reason unknown), sailing again on 20 August to take position south of Iceland. On 24 August U-557 found and reported convoy OS 4 and started shadowing it. As reinforcements arrived, Paulssen was permitted to attack; he made three approaches, sinking four ships in total. Seven other U-boats joined the assault, but only one had any success. U-557 continued to shadow, but had no further success and on 28 August the attack was called off. On 28 August U-557 joined the Bosemuller patrol line. On 2 September this was reconfigured into patrol line Seewolf. Neither had any success and on 15 September U-557 was ordered to return, arriving at Lorient on 19 September.

=== Third patrol ===
On 19 November 1941 U-557 sailed from Lorient bound for the Mediterranean. Werner had been reassigned and had left the boat at this point. On 25/26 November she successfully penetrated the Straits of Gibraltar, despite Allied ASW patrols, and on 2 December sank the freighter Fjord off Cape Estepona, Spain. This caused some controversy, as a subsequent investigation showed this attack had infringed Spanish neutrality, having taken place within Spanish territorial waters. U-557 arrived at Messina on 7 December 1941.

=== Fourth patrol ===
On 9 December U-557 sailed again on her fourth and last patrol, into the eastern Mediterranean. In company with the Italian submarine Dagabur, on the night of 14/15 December 1941 she encountered the British light cruiser HMS Galatea. Both submarines made attacks on the cruiser and she sank with the loss of more than half her crew. U-557 has been credited with the sinking.

News of this sinking even reached the Submarine Tracking Room in London.

== Fate ==
At 18:06 on 16 December, U-557 sent a short radio signal indicating that she was 18 hours from port. At 18:00 on the same day, the Italian torpedo boat Orione left the Cretan port of Suda. The commander had no knowledge that a German U-boat was in the area of Crete.

When the Italian commander saw a submarine at 21:44, heading in a northerly direction, he decided to ram it, supposing it to be British. U-557 sank immediately with all hands; the damaged Italian torpedo boat headed back to base. The position of the incident was given by the Italian commander as 35.31°N 23.19°E. An investigation by Supermarina (Italian Naval Command) determined the collision was an accident, though they reserved judgement on whether the ramming was intended, or the result of a navigational error. They also noted that German notification of U-557's presence in the area did not arrive with Supermarina until 22:00, after the incident had taken place.

== Wolfpacks ==
U-557 took part in three wolfpacks, namely:

- West (25 May – 20 June 1941)
- Bosemüller (28 August – 2 September 1941)
- Seewolf (2 – 15 September 1941)

== Summary of raiding history ==
Date	Ship Name	Nationality	Tonnage (Note: Merchant ship tonnages are in gross register tons. Military vessels are listed by tons displacement.)	Fate
29 May 1941	Empire Storm	United Kingdom	7,290	Sunk
27 August 1941	Embassage	United Kingdom	4,954	Sunk
27 August 1941	Saugor	United Kingdom	6,303	Sunk
27 August 1941	Segundo	Norway	4,414	Sunk
27 August 1941	Tremoda	United Kingdom	4,736	Sunk
2 December 1941	Fjord	Norway	4,032	Sunk
15 December 1941	HMS Galatea	Royal Navy	5,220	Sunk

== Bibliography ==
- Blair, Clay (1996). Hitler's U-Boat War: The Hunters 1939-1942. Cassell. ISBN 0-304-35260-8.
- Busch, Rainer; Röll, Hans-Joachim (1999). German U-boat commanders of World War II : a biographical dictionary. Translated by Brooks, Geoffrey. London, Annapolis, Md: Greenhill Books, Naval Institute Press. ISBN 1-55750-186-6.
- Busch, Rainer; Röll, Hans-Joachim (1999). Deutsche U-Boot-Verluste von September 1939 bis Mai 1945 [German U-boat losses from September 1939 to May 1945]. Der U-Boot-Krieg (in German). Vol. IV. Hamburg, Berlin, Bonn: Mittler. ISBN 3-8132-0514-2.
- Gröner, Erich; Jung, Dieter; Maass, Martin (1991). U-boats and Mine Warfare Vessels. German Warships 1815–1945. Vol. 2. Translated by Thomas, Keith; Magowan, Rachel. London: Conway Maritime Press. ISBN 0-85177-593-4.
- Kemp, Paul (1997). U-Boats Destroyed, German submarine losses in the World Wars. Arms and Armour. ISBN 1-85409-515-3.
- Niestle, Axel (1998). German U-Boat Losses During World War II. Greenhill. ISBN 1-85367-352-8.
- Herbert Werner Iron Coffins (1969) Cassel & Co. ISBN 0-304-35330-2
