= German submarine U-230 =

German World War II submarine

History

Nazi Germany
- Name: U-230
- Ordered: 7 December 1940
- Builder: Germaniawerft, Kiel
- Yard number: 660
- Laid down: 25 November 1941
- Launched: 10 September 1942
- Commissioned: 24 October 1942
- Fate: Scuttled, 21 August 1944

General characteristics
- Class & type: Type VIIC submarine
- Displacement: 769 tonnes (757 long tons) surfaced; 871 t (857 long tons) submerged
- Length: 67.10 m (220 ft 2 in) o/a; 50.50 m (165 ft 8 in) pressure hull
- Beam: 6.20 m (20 ft 4 in) o/a; 4.70 m (15 ft 5 in) pressure hull
- Height: 9.60 m (31 ft 6 in)
- Draught: 4.74 m (15 ft 7 in)
- Installed power: 2,800–3,200 PS (2,100–2,400 kW; 2,800–3,200 bhp) (diesels); 750 PS (550 kW; 740 shp) (electric)
- Propulsion: 2 shafts; 2 × diesel engines; 2 × electric motors
- Speed: 17.7 knots (32.8 km/h; 20.4 mph) surfaced; 7.6 knots (14.1 km/h; 8.7 mph) submerged
- Range: 8,500 nmi (15,700 km; 9,800 mi) at 10 knots (19 km/h; 12 mph) surfaced; 80 nmi (150 km; 92 mi) at 4 knots (7.4 km/h; 4.6 mph) submerged
- Test depth: 230 m (750 ft); Crush depth: 250–295 m (820–968 ft)
- Complement: 4 officers, 40–56 enlisted
- Armament: 5 × 53.3 cm (21 in) torpedo tubes (four bow, one stern); 14 × torpedoes or 26 TMA mines; 1 × 8.8 cm (3.46 in) deck gun (220 rounds); 1 x 2 cm (0.79 in) C/30 AA gun

Service record
- Part of: 5th U-boat Flotilla; 24 October 1942 – 31 January 1943; 9th U-boat Flotilla; 1 February – 30 November 1943; 29th U-boat Flotilla; 1 December 1943 – 21 August 1944
- Identification codes: M 49 209
- Commanders: Kptlt. Paul Siegmann; 24 October 1942 – 11 August 1944; Oblt.z.S. Heinz-Eugen Eberbach; 12 – 21 August 1944
- Operations: 8 patrols: 1st patrol: 11 February – 31 March 1943; 2nd patrol: 24 April – 24 May 1943; 3rd patrol: 5 July – 8 September 1943; 4th patrol: 22 November – 16 December 1943; 5th patrol: a. 19 January – 24 February 1944; b. 6 – 9 April 1944; 6th patrol: 11 April – 21 May 1944; 7th patrol: 27 – 30 June 1944; 8th patrol: 17 – 21 August 1944
- Victories: 1 merchant ship sunk (2,868 GRT); 3 warships sunk (3,585 tons)

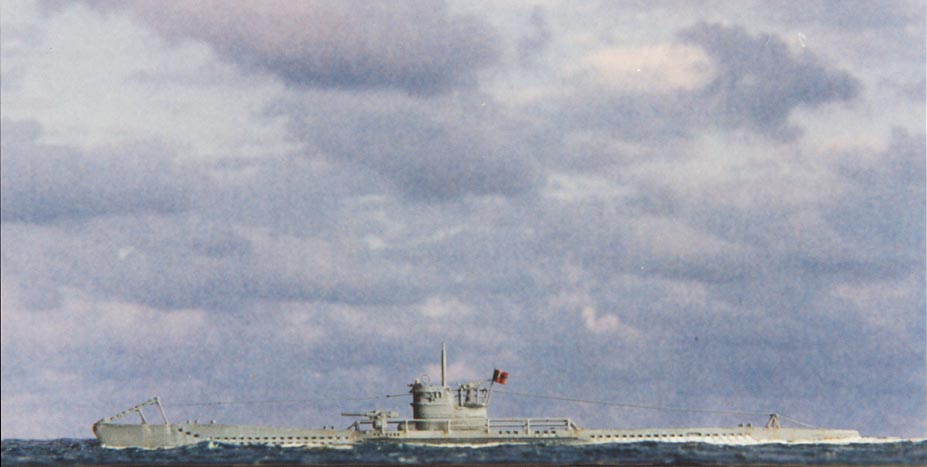
Type VIIC U-boat

U-230 was a Type VIIC U-boat built for Nazi Germany's navy (Kriegsmarine) for service during World War II.

She was laid down on 25 November 1941, at the Krupp yard in Kiel as yard number 660, launched on 10 September, and commissioned on 24 October 1942, with Kapitänleutnant Paul Siegmann in command. Her First Officer, during her first three war patrols, was Herbert Werner, author of the best-selling postwar memoir Iron Coffins. She carried out three patrols and was a member of three wolfpacks before moving to the Mediterranean. She was scuttled there by her crew when the Allies landed near Toulon, France, on 21 August 1944.

== Design ==
German Type VIIC submarines were preceded by the shorter Type VIIB submarines. U-230 had a displacement of 769 tonnes (757 long tons) when at the surface and 871 tonnes (857 long tons) while submerged. She had a total length of 67.10 m (220 ft 2 in), a pressure hull length of 50.50 m (165 ft 8 in), a beam of 6.20 m (20 ft 4 in), a height of 9.60 m (31 ft 6 in), and a draught of 4.74 m (15 ft 7 in). The submarine was powered by two Germaniawerft F46 four-stroke, six-cylinder supercharged diesel engines producing a total of 2,800 to 3,200 metric horsepower (2,060 to 2,350 kW; 2,760 to 3,160 shp) for use while surfaced, two AEG GU 460/8–27 double-acting electric motors producing a total of 750 metric horsepower (550 kW; 740 shp) for use while submerged. She had two shafts and two 1.23 m (4 ft) propellers. The boat was capable of operating at depths of up to 230 metres (750 ft).

The submarine had a maximum surface speed of 17.7 knots (32.8 km/h; 20.4 mph) and a maximum submerged speed of 7.6 knots (14.1 km/h; 8.7 mph). When submerged, the boat could operate for 80 nautical miles (150 km; 92 mi) at 4 knots (7.4 km/h; 4.6 mph); when surfaced, she could travel 8,500 nautical miles (15,700 km; 9,800 mi) at 10 knots (19 km/h; 12 mph). U-230 was fitted with five 53.3 cm (21 in) torpedo tubes (four fitted at the bow and one at the stern), fourteen torpedoes, one 8.8 cm (3.46 in) SK C/35 naval gun, 220 rounds, and an anti-aircraft gun. The boat had a complement of between forty-four and sixty.

== Service history ==
=== First patrol ===
U-230's initial sortie began on 4 February 1943, when she left Kiel, arriving at Bergen on 9 February; she departed from Bergen on 11 February, for a war patrol east of Newfoundland with group Burggraf.

The bad weather and difficult sea conditions encountered are described by Werner in his book: The weather was so bad that personnel on watch on the bridge were forced to wear rubber diving suits and eye masks. They had to be secured to the wildly pitching and yawing U-boat by steel belts. Below, it was no better, with bodies being hurled in all directions.

Burggraf had no success and was disbanded on 5 March, with U-230 and others forming the nucleus of group Westmark.

On 6 March, U-230 joined group Westmark; that day U-405 made contact with convoy SC 121, a slow eastbound convoy of 59 ships. and U-230 together with U-591 engaged that night, sinking the freighter Egyptian. Over the next three days, Westmark kept in contact, and a total of eight ships were sunk, but Seigmann and U-230 had no further success. On 10 March, BdU called off the attack.

On 11 March, Westmark was disbanded and U-230 returned to base, arriving at Brest on 31 March.

=== Second patrol ===
U-230 set out for her second patrol on 24 April 1943. She was initially accompanied by U-456. After safely negotiating the Bay of Biscay, the boat joined group Drossel, a twelve-boat pack instructed to attack south-bound convoys supplying Allied forces in North Africa. Drossel was assisted by reconnaissance flights by air force Condors which reported two convoys on 3 May; one of 24 to 27 “barges” (actually large Landing Craft) and another southbound convoy of eleven ships bound for West Africa. During a disastrous attack on the LCTs, where no hits were scored, two U-boats were lost in a collision, and a couple of nights later two others damaged in a second collision.

On 6 May, U-607 sighted SL 128, north-bound from West Africa, and all remaining Drossel boats moved to intercept. One ship was sunk by U-89 that night and U-456 was damaged in counter-attacks. U-230 had no success but Seigmann continued to shadow the convoy until the operation was cancelled by BdU on 7 May.

The remaining Drossel boats were then instructed to move north-westwards to assist groups in the North Atlantic. On 9 May, the five Drossel boats joined the U-boats of Rhein and Elbe groups which were in contact with convoy HX 237, and attacked the convoy over the next three days. During this attack three ships were sunk and three U-boats destroyed (a ruinous exchange rate) but U-230 had no success. On 12 May, while under air attack, U-230 shot down a Swordfish. Werner reports in Iron Coffins that he himself fired the weapon that did this.

Following this U-230 returned to base, one of only four Drossel boats to complete a patrol and do so.

=== Chesapeake Bay ===
On 5 July 1943, U-230 departed Brest in company with U-566 on a mission to lay mines in the Chesapeake Bay on the east coast of the United States.

Arriving at the end of the month U-230 laid 8 TMC mines on the night of 26/27 July, in the mouth of the Chesapeake Bay; a few days later U-566 laid 12 TMB mines nearby. Neither of these minefields achieved any sinkings. Returning across the Atlantic U-566 sank the US patrol vessel Plymouth with the loss of more than 90 of her crew, sparking a massive ASW operation by the Tenth Fleet. Both U-boats escaped without detection.

To assist this operation both U-boats were to re-fuel in mid-ocean from the Kriegsmarine's flotilla of Type XIV U-tankers; however a concerted campaign against these, leading to the destruction of four (out of ten) in July alone severely disrupted U-boat operations in the far oceans.

On 24 July, U-tanker U-459 was destroyed two days out of Bordeaux. On 30 July, three U-boats, two of them Type XIVs, were attacked and destroyed by aircraft of the RAF and ships of FJ Walker's 2nd Support Group. On 4 August, U-489 was sunk south of Iceland. This led to the diversion of provisional tankers U-117 and U-847 to refuel boats returning from North America. On 7 August, U-117 was destroyed, leaving U-230 and others in difficult straits. On 24 August U-847, under Kptlt. Herbert Kuppisch, refueled several boats, including U-172. Her commander found Kuppisch too casual about the threat of air attack, an observation repeated by Werner in his book.

Werner relates he asked them; "What's the matter with you people, don't you have any respect for aircraft?".

Kuppisch replied: "We haven't seen any since we passed Greenland."

Six U-boats re-fueled from U-847 on the morning of 27 August, U-230 included, but just hours later U-847 was sunk by aircraft from the escort carrier Card.

Travelling in concert with U-634, U-230 approached the Bay of Biscay when they encountered north-bound convoy SL 135. Dalhaus in U-634 attempted to attack but before he could do so he was himself attacked and destroyed by two escort vessels. U-230 escaped without being detected. and arrived back in Brest on 8 September 1943.

=== The Mediterranean ===
In November 1943, U-230 was reassigned to the Mediterranean, for attachment to 29th U-boat flotilla at Toulon. She departed Brest on 22 November, and by 5 December, had arrived at the Straits of Gibraltar Werner reports that the passage through the heavily defended Straits was uneventful; he also describes the boat's hydrophones picking up the sound of dolphins playing and "talking to each other". U-230 arrived at Toulon on 16 December. At this point Werner left U-230 for reassignment to his own command.

On 19 January 1944, U-230 left Toulon for a patrol against Allied shipping taking part in Operation Shingle, the Allied landings at Anzio. During this operation U-230 sank two Tank Landing Ships, on 16 and 20 February. She escaped retribution and returned to base at La Spezia on 24 February.

In April 1944, U-230 returned briefly to Toulon before departing on 11 April, to undertake another patrol in the Tyrrhenian Sea. On 9 May, she encountered and sank an American patrol craft, PC-558, which was escorting a coastal convoy. She again escaped and returned to La Spezia on 21 May.

At the end of June, U-230 returned to Toulon where Seigmann relinquished command, handing over to Oblt. Heinz-Eugen Eberbach. (Note: Heinz-Eugen Eberbach was the son of General der Panzertruppe Heinrich Eberbach)

Air raids on Toulon in July and early August, and on Salamis, left the remaining 11 U-boats in the Mediterranean unserviceable; Five were wrecked at Toulon in the raid on 6 August, and the remaining three based there, including U-230, were scuttled to avoid capture following Operation Dragoon, the Allied landings in Southern France.

On 17 August 1944, Eberbach took U-230 out on her last voyage, scuttling her on 21 August, after she ran aground in Toulon Roads.

The crew managed to capture a fishing trawler and headed first for Italy, but later decided to head for Spain and internment instead when she received news about the course of the war in Italy. On 27 August 1944, the destroyer Ericsson's radar picked up the trawler. The American warship was ordered to investigate and found the damaged fishing trawler with an inoperative engine and fifty Germans aboard. The crew of U-230 were taken prisoner. The trawler was taken in tow.

== Summary of raiding history ==
Date	Ship Name	Nationality	Tonnage (Note: Merchant ship tonnages are in gross register tons. Military vessels are listed by tons displacement.)	Fate
7 March 1943	Egyptian	United Kingdom	2,868	Sunk
16 February 1944	HMS LST-418	Royal Navy	1,625	Sunk
20 February 1944	HMS LST-305	Royal Navy	1,625	Sunk
9 May 1944	USS PC-558	United States Navy	335	Sunk

== Bibliography ==
- Blair, Clay (1998). Hitler's U-boat War: The Hunted, 1942-1945. Vol. 2. Cassell. ISBN 0-304-35261-6.
- Busch, Rainer; Röll, Hans-Joachim (1999). German U-boat commanders of World War II : a biographical dictionary. Translated by Brooks, Geoffrey. London, Annapolis, Md: Greenhill Books, Naval Institute Press. ISBN 1-55750-186-6.
- Busch, Rainer; Röll, Hans-Joachim (1999). Der U-Boot-Krieg, 1939-1945: Deutsche U-Boot-Verluste von September 1939 bis Mai 1945 [German U-boat losses from September 1939 to May 1945] (in German). Vol. IV. Hamburg, Berlin, Bonn: Mittler. ISBN 3-8132-0514-2.
- Gröner, Eric; Jung, Dieter; Maass, Martin (1991). German Warships 1815-1945: U-boats and Mine Warfare Vessels. Vol. 2. Translated by Thomas, Keith; Magowan, Rachel. London: Conway Maritime Press. ISBN 0-85177-593-4.
- Kemp, Paul (1999). U-Boats Destroyed – German Submarine Losses in the World Wars. London: Arms & Armour. ISBN 1-85409-515-3.
- Niestle, Axel (1998). German U-Boat Losses During World War II. Greenhill. ISBN 1-85367-352-8.
- Herbert A Werner Iron Coffins (1969; reprinted 1999) Cassel ISBN 978-0-3043-5330-9
