= Convoy SC 130 =

Convoy during naval battles of the Second World War

- Part of World War II
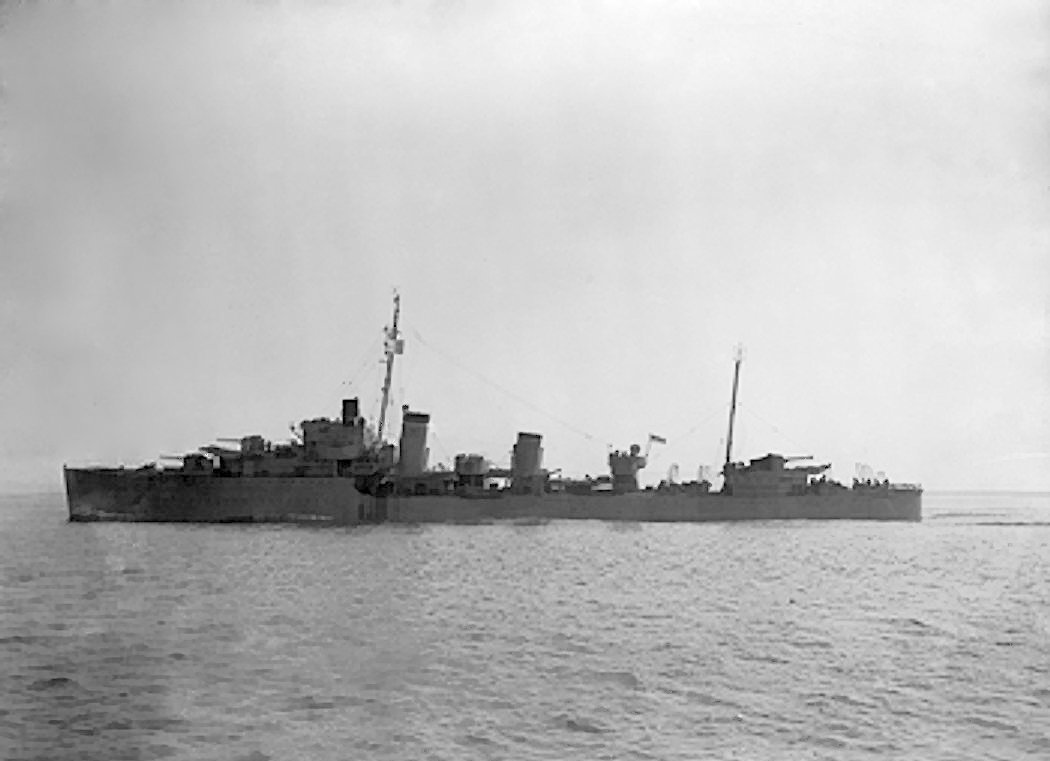
- HMS Duncan in March 1943
Date	18–20 May 1943
Location	North Atlantic
Result	Allied victory

Belligerents
Germany	United Kingdom; Canada

Commanders and leaders
Admiral Karl Dönitz	Comm: HC Forsyth; B-7 Group: Cdr. P Gretton

Strength
25 U-boats	37 ships 8 escorts

Casualties and losses
3 U-boats destroyed 1 U-boat damaged 142 dead	no ships sunk

Convoy SC 130 was a North Atlantic convoy which ran during the battle of the Atlantic in World War II. It was the 130th of the numbered series of slow convoys of merchant ships from Sydney, Cape Breton Island to Liverpool. SC 130 was one of several convoy battles that occurred during the crisis month of May 1943.

== Background ==
SC 130, comprising thirty-seven ships, departed Halifax Harbour on 11 May 1943 in the care of a Western Local Escort Force, led by RCN destroyer Niagara. The Convoy Commodore was HC Forsyth in the freighter Sheaf Holme. They were met on 15 May by Mid-Ocean Escort Force Group B-7, led by Commander Peter Gretton in the D-class leader HMS Duncan and consisting of the V and W-class destroyer HMS Vidette, the River-class frigate HMS Tay, and Flower-class corvettes HMS Snowflake, HMS Sunflower, HMS Pink, HMS Loosestrife and two armed trawlers. As B-7 was one vessel short for the voyage, the corvette HMCS Kitchener was seconded from the local group for the crossing. SC 130 also included two oilers for mid-ocean re-fueling and re-arming, and the convoy rescue ship Zamalek.

Ranged against them were 25 U-boats in three patrol lines, which had been organized by U-boat Command BdU on 15 May. This was in response to intelligence from the signals intelligence group B-Dienst which reported a westbound convoy (ONS 7) and two eastbound (HX 238 and SC 130) approaching the Air Gap. One group, Iller, of six newly arrived boats was just arriving, while two other groups, Donau I and Donau II, were formed from boats already on station plus reinforcements.

ONS 7 came under attack on 13 May, and, warned by this and by intelligence from HF/DF readings and Enigma decrypts, the Admiralty was able to divert HX 238 (which arrived without incident) and to reinforce SC 130.

== Action ==
The convoy was found and reported on the evening of 18 May, by U-304 which commenced shadowing, while the other U-boats gathered during the night. The B7 group mounted an aggressive defence, chasing down all contacts in order to frustrate any attacks. In this they were successful and none of the U-boats were able to attack that night.

On 19 May long-range aircraft were able to join the action and commenced patrolling, attacking Donau boats as they moved to join the assault. A Hudson of 269 Sqdn destroyed U-273, and a Liberator of 120 Sqdn attacked another: This was thought to have sunk U-954, but later judged to have hit U-731, causing little damage. Later that day the convoy escort was reinforced by the 1st Support Group consisting of the Banff-class sloop HMS Sennen (Capt. G Brewer) with the River-class frigates HMS Wear, HMS Jed and HMS Spey. Within hours U-954 was sunk by hedgehog attacks from Sennen and Jed. Admiral Karl Dönitz's son Peter Dönitz was among those lost aboard U-954. An attack by Snowflake and Duncan delivered a hit with a Hedgehog bomb, and was thought to have destroyed a U-boat (U-381) but this was later claimed to have hit U-636, which survived with damage. That evening Tay attacked U-952 and damaged her so badly she had to retire from the action and return to base.

On 20 May the assault continued, but without success, while No. 120 Squadron RAF B-24 Liberator J sank U-258. At midday on 20th BdU called off the action, and the U-boats withdrew.

The convoy reached Liverpool without loss on 26 May.

== Aftermath ==
SC 130 was seen as an Allied victory. No ships had been lost, though two had returned to port; all 35 that made the crossing arrived safely. On the other hand, at least three U-boats were destroyed. This was a major blow which contributed to BdU's decision to abandon the assault on the North Atlantic convoy route, a turning point in the Battle of the Atlantic.

== Table ==
U-boats destroyed

Date	Number	Type	Location	Casualties	Sunk by...
19 May 1943	U-273	VIIC	N Atlantic; 59°25′N 24°33′W	46	Air attack, Hudson M, 269 Sqdn
19 May 1943	U-954	VIIC	N Atlantic	47	Hedgehogged by Sennen, Jed
20 May 1943	U-258	VIIC	N Atlantic; 55°18′N 27°49′W	49	Air attack by Liberator F, 120 Sqdn
