= German submarine U-209 =

German World War II submarine

Coordinates: 52°00′N 38°00′W

History

Nazi Germany
- Name: U-209
- Ordered: 16 October 1939
- Builder: Germaniawerft, Kiel
- Yard number: 638
- Laid down: 28 November 1940
- Launched: 28 August 1941
- Commissioned: 11 October 1941
- Fate: Missing since 7 May 1943, possible diving accident

General characteristics
- Class & type: Type VIIC submarine
- Displacement: 769 tonnes (757 long tons) surfaced; 871 t (857 long tons) submerged
- Length: 67.10 m (220 ft 2 in) o/a; 50.50 m (165 ft 8 in) pressure hull
- Beam: 6.20 m (20 ft 4 in) o/a; 4.70 m (15 ft 5 in) pressure hull
- Height: 9.60 m (31 ft 6 in)
- Draught: 4.74 m (15 ft 7 in)
- Installed power: 2,800–3,200 PS (2,100–2,400 kW; 2,800–3,200 bhp) (diesels); 750 PS (550 kW; 740 shp) (electric)
- Propulsion: 2 shafts; 2 × diesel engines; 2 × electric motors
- Speed: 17.7 knots (32.8 km/h; 20.4 mph) surfaced; 7.6 knots (14.1 km/h; 8.7 mph) submerged
- Range: 8,500 nmi (15,700 km; 9,800 mi) at 10 knots (19 km/h; 12 mph) surfaced; 80 nmi (150 km; 92 mi) at 4 knots (7.4 km/h; 4.6 mph) submerged
- Test depth: 230 m (750 ft); Crush depth: 250–295 m (820–968 ft)
- Complement: 4 officers, 40–56 enlisted
- Armament: 5 × 53.3 cm (21 in) torpedo tubes (four bow, one stern); 14 × G7e torpedoes or 26 TMA mines; 1 × 8.8 cm (3.5 in) SK C/35 deck gun (220 rounds); 1 × 2 cm (0.79 in) C/30

Service record
- Part of: 6th U-boat Flotilla; 11 October 1941 – 30 June 1942; 11th U-boat Flotilla; 1 July 1942 – 28 February 1943; 1st U-boat Flotilla; 1 March – 7 May 1943
- Identification codes: M 30 549
- Commanders: Kptlt. Heinrich Brodda; 11 October 1941 – 7 May 1943
- Operations: 7 patrols: 1st patrol: 15 March – 1 April 1942; 2nd patrol: 7 – 20 April 1942; 3rd patrol: a. 16 May – 2 June 1942; b. 4 – 7 June 1942; 4th patrol: 17 – 28 July 1942; 5th patrol: a. 5 August – 1 September 1942; b. 3 – 6 September 1942; c. 12 – 15 October 1942; 6th patrol: a. 6 November – 10 December 1942; b. 13 – 16 December 1942; c. 19 – 24 December 1942; 7th patrol: 6 April – 7 May 1943
- Victories: 3 merchant ships sunk (1,136 GRT); 1 merchant ship total loss (220 GRT)

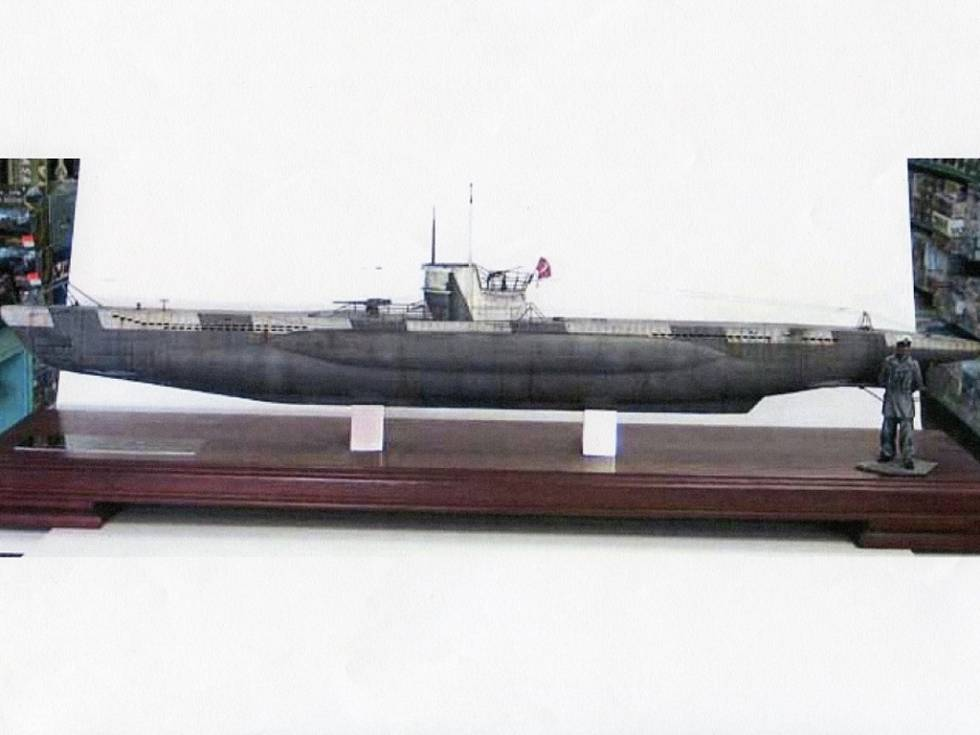
Model kit of the Revell German Submarine Type VIIC U-boat 209

German submarine U-209 was a Type VIIC U-boat of the Kriegsmarine during World War II. The submarine was laid down on 28 November 1940 by the Friedrich Krupp Germaniawerft yard at Kiel as yard number 638, launched on 28 August 1941 and commissioned on 11 October under the command of Kapitänleutnant Heinrich Brodda.

She was lost in May 1943, possibly due to a diving accident.

== Design ==
German Type VIIC submarines were preceded by the shorter Type VIIB submarines. U-209 had a displacement of 769 tonnes (757 long tons) when at the surface and 871 tonnes (857 long tons) while submerged. She had a total length of 67.10 m (220 ft 2 in), a pressure hull length of 50.50 m (165 ft 8 in), a beam of 6.20 m (20 ft 4 in), a height of 9.60 m (31 ft 6 in), and a draught of 4.74 m (15 ft 7 in). The submarine was powered by two Germaniawerft F46 four-stroke, six-cylinder supercharged diesel engines producing a total of 2,800 to 3,200 metric horsepower (2,060 to 2,350 kW; 2,760 to 3,160 shp) for use while surfaced, two AEG GU 460/8–27 double-acting electric motors producing a total of 750 metric horsepower (550 kW; 740 shp) for use while submerged. She had two shafts and two 1.23 m (4 ft) propellers. The boat was capable of operating at depths of up to 230 metres (750 ft).

The submarine had a maximum surface speed of 17.7 knots (32.8 km/h; 20.4 mph) and a maximum submerged speed of 7.6 knots (14.1 km/h; 8.7 mph). When submerged, the boat could operate for 80 nautical miles (150 km; 92 mi) at 4 knots (7.4 km/h; 4.6 mph); when surfaced, she could travel 8,500 nautical miles (15,700 km; 9,800 mi) at 10 knots (19 km/h; 12 mph). U-209 was fitted with five 53.3 cm (21 in) torpedo tubes (four fitted at the bow and one at the stern), fourteen torpedoes, one 8.8 cm (3.46 in) SK C/35 naval gun, 220 rounds, and a 2 cm (0.79 in) C/30 anti-aircraft gun. The boat had a complement of between forty-four and sixty.

== Service history ==
U-209 began her service career as part of the 6th U-boat Flotilla for training, she then commenced operations with the same organization on 1 March 1942. She was reassigned to the 11th flotilla on 1 July 1942. She was with the 1st flotilla until her loss on 7 May 1943. She carried out a total of seven patrols and was a member of nine wolfpacks.

=== First patrol ===
She made the short journey from Kiel to the German island of Helgoland and then departed on her first patrol on 15 March 1942. She headed north, into the Norwegian Sea, then east. The boat was attacked by the armed trawler HMS Blackfly on the 28th; but conditions were so bad that the ship could not use her armament because it was frozen. Depth charges were little better, at least one malfunctioned.

The submarine also came under attack from two minesweepers, HMS Hussar (J826) and Gossamer in the Barents Sea on the 29th. U-209 escaped.

=== Second patrol ===
The boat's second sortie began in the Norwegian port of Kirkenes in the far north of the country. She patrolled the vicinity of Bear Island, then sailed south and southwest, before docking in Bergen, also in Norway.

=== Third and fourth patrols ===
Her third and fourth patrols, in June and July 1942, covered the Norwegian Sea and the passage between Bear Island and Svalbard, it saw her depart Bergen and return to Kirkenes.

=== Fifth patrol ===
The boat attacked a small Soviet convoy on 17 August 1942, near Mateev Island in the eastern Barents Sea. She sank the Komiles, the Komsomolets, (Note: Komsomolets is a member of the Communist Youth League (Komsomol). Komsolec is an obvious error as there is no such real word.) SH-500 and P-4, (two tugs and two barges), with her gun. One more tug Nord managed to escape. The P-4 barge was carrying some 300 detained people who worked at the Norilstroi (see Norillag) and almost all drowned.

=== Sixth and seventh patrols and loss ===
Patrol number six, at 35 days, was her longest. It took her northwest of Bear Island.

By now the boat had returned to Kiel, from where she departed for the last time on 6 April 1943. She was attacked by a British B-17 Flying Fortress of No. 220 Squadron RAF southeast of Iceland, on the 16th, sustaining damage to her periscope. She was also attacked by a Canadian PBY Catalina (known as a Canso) of No. 5 Squadron RCAF on 4 May. The damage incurred included her radio transmitter, so a message to Bdu (U-boat headquarters), was sent via U-954. U-209 was recalled, but she was never heard from again; her loss might be explained by a diving accident. Whatever the reason, forty-six men died; there were no survivors.

=== Afterword ===
U-209 was originally thought to have been sunk by the frigate HMS Jed and the sloop HMS Sennen on 19 May 1943. This attack was responsible for the demise of U-954. U-209 was nicknamed "Brno" by the south Moravian town in where the crew took a holiday in February 1943. They were invited by SS-Sturmbannführer Konrad Nussbaum, chief of Brno Kripo, whose son was one of the crew. Brno municipality received as a gift a model of the submarine (photos exist) but the model itself was probably lost after the end of World War II.

=== Wolfpacks ===
U-209 took part in nine wolfpacks, namely:

- Zieten (23 – 29 March 1942)
- Eiswolf (29 – 31 March 1942)
- Robbenschlag (7 – 14 April 1942)
- Blutrausch (15 April 1942)
- Greif (16 – 29 May 1942)
- Boreas (19 November - 7 December 1942)
- Meise (25 – 27 April 1943)
- Star (27 April - 4 May 1943)
- Fink (4 – 6 May 1943)

== Summary of raiding history ==
Date	Ship Name	Nationality	Tonnage (GRT)	Fate
17 August 1942	Komiles	Soviet Union	136	Sunk
17 August 1942	Komsomolets	Soviet Union	220	Total loss
17 August 1942	P-4	Soviet Union	500	Sunk
17 August 1942	Sh-500	Soviet Union	500	Sunk

== Bibliography ==
- Busch, Rainer; Röll, Hans-Joachim (1999). German U-boat commanders of World War II : a biographical dictionary. Translated by Brooks, Geoffrey. London, Annapolis, Md: Greenhill Books, Naval Institute Press. ISBN 1-55750-186-6.
- Busch, Rainer; Röll, Hans-Joachim (1999). Deutsche U-Boot-Verluste von September 1939 bis Mai 1945 [German U-boat losses from September 1939 to May 1945]. Der U-Boot-Krieg (in German). Vol. IV. Hamburg, Berlin, Bonn: Mittler. ISBN 3-8132-0514-2.
- Gröner, Erich; Jung, Dieter; Maass, Martin (1991). U-boats and Mine Warfare Vessels. German Warships 1815–1945. Vol. 2. Translated by Thomas, Keith; Magowan, Rachel. London: Conway Maritime Press. ISBN 0-85177-593-4.
