= German submarine U-381 =

German World War II submarine

History

Nazi Germany
- Name: U-381
- Ordered: 16 October 1939
- Builder: Howaldtswerke AG, Kiel
- Yard number: 12
- Laid down: 26 April 1941
- Launched: 14 January 1942
- Commissioned: 25 February 1942
- Fate: Went missing south of Greenland since 10 May 1943

General characteristics
- Class & type: Type VIIC submarine
- Displacement: 769 tonnes (757 long tons) surfaced; 871 t (857 long tons) submerged
- Length: 67.10 m (220 ft 2 in) o/a; 50.50 m (165 ft 8 in) pressure hull
- Beam: 6.20 m (20 ft 4 in) o/a; 4.70 m (15 ft 5 in) pressure hull
- Height: 9.60 m (31 ft 6 in)
- Draught: 4.74 m (15 ft 7 in)
- Installed power: 2,800–3,200 PS (2,100–2,400 kW; 2,800–3,200 bhp) (diesels); 750 PS (550 kW; 740 shp) (electric)
- Propulsion: 2 shafts; 2 × diesel engines; 2 × electric motors
- Speed: 17.7 knots (32.8 km/h; 20.4 mph) surfaced; 7.6 knots (14.1 km/h; 8.7 mph) submerged
- Range: 8,500 nmi (15,700 km; 9,800 mi) at 10 knots (19 km/h; 12 mph) surfaced; 80 nmi (150 km; 92 mi) at 4 knots (7.4 km/h; 4.6 mph) submerged
- Test depth: 230 m (750 ft); Crush depth: 250–295 m (820–968 ft)
- Complement: 4 officers, 40–56 enlisted
- Armament: 5 × 53.3 cm (21 in) torpedo tubes (four bow, one stern); 14 × torpedoes; 1 × 8.8 cm (3.46 in) deck gun (220 rounds); 1 x 2 cm (0.79 in) C/30 AA gun

Service record
- Part of: 5th U-boat Flotilla; 25 February – 30 September 1942; 7th U-boat Flotilla; 1 October 1942 – 10 May 1943
- Identification codes: M 43 526
- Commanders: Kptlt. Wilhelm-Heinrich Graf von Pückler und Limpurg; 25 February 1942 – 10 May 1943
- Operations: 3 patrols: 1st patrol: 1 October – 21 November 1942; 2nd patrol: 19 December 1942 – 19 February 1943; 3rd patrol: 31 March – 10 May 1943
- Victories: None

German submarine U-381 was a Type VIIC U-boat built for Nazi Germany's Kriegsmarine for service during World War II. She failed to return in May 1943 and was declared missing in unknown circumstances.

The boat was laid down on 26 April 1941 at the Howaldtswerke in Kiel as yard number 12, launched on 14 January 1942 and commissioned on 25 February; Kapitänleutnant Wilhelm-Heinrich Graf von Pückler und Limpurg was her CO throughout her career.

She did not sink any ships.

The submarine was previously thought to have been sunk by HMS Duncan (escorting convoy SC130 Halifax to Liverpool) commanded by Captain Peter Gretton and HMS Snowflake.

== Design ==
German Type VIIC submarines were preceded by the shorter Type VIIB submarines. U-381 had a displacement of 769 tonnes (757 long tons) when at the surface and 871 tonnes (857 long tons) while submerged. She had a total length of 67.10 m (220 ft 2 in), a pressure hull length of 50.50 m (165 ft 8 in), a beam of 6.20 m (20 ft 4 in), a height of 9.60 m (31 ft 6 in), and a draught of 4.74 m (15 ft 7 in). The submarine was powered by two Germaniawerft F46 four-stroke, six-cylinder supercharged diesel engines producing a total of 2,800 to 3,200 metric horsepower (2,060 to 2,350 kW; 2,760 to 3,160 shp) for use while surfaced, two Garbe, Lahmeyer & Co. RP 137/c double-acting electric motors producing a total of 750 metric horsepower (550 kW; 740 shp) for use while submerged. She had two shafts and two 1.23 m (4 ft) propellers. The boat was capable of operating at depths of up to 230 metres (750 ft).

The submarine had a maximum surface speed of 17.7 knots (32.8 km/h; 20.4 mph) and a maximum submerged speed of 7.6 knots (14.1 km/h; 8.7 mph). When submerged, the boat could operate for 80 nautical miles (150 km; 92 mi) at 4 knots (7.4 km/h; 4.6 mph); when surfaced, she could travel 8,500 nautical miles (15,700 km; 9,800 mi) at 10 knots (19 km/h; 12 mph). U-381 was fitted with five 53.3 cm (21 in) torpedo tubes (four fitted at the bow and one at the stern), fourteen torpedoes, one 8.8 cm (3.46 in) SK C/35 naval gun, 220 rounds, and a 2 cm (0.79 in) C/30 anti-aircraft gun. The boat had a complement of between forty-four and sixty.

== Service history ==
She began her service life in the 5th U-boat Flotilla, a training organization, between 25 February 1942 and 30 September of the same year, before moving on to the 7th flotilla for operations.

=== First patrol ===
U381's first sortie took her from Kiel to a point three-quarters of the way across the Atlantic before steaming empty-handed to St. Nazaire in France.

=== Second patrol ===
Her next patrol was no better, starting and finishing in St. Nazaire between 19 December 1942 and 19 February 1943, a total of 63 days at sea. She was unsuccessfully attacked on the return leg west of Portugal by a Catalina flying boat of No. 202 Squadron RAF.

=== Third patrol and loss ===
U-381's third patrol ended abruptly after 52 days when she was sunk with the loss of all hands, probably on or around 21 May 1943. She was lost in mid-Atlantic (south of Greenland) through unknown circumstances.

=== Previously recorded fate ===
A postwar assessment stated that U-381 was sunk on May 19, 1943 in the North Atlantic southeast of Cape Farewell, Greenland at position 54°41′N 34°45′W by depth charges from HMS Duncan and HMS Snowflake. This attack was actually against U-304 and U-636, both of which escaped with no damage.

=== Wolfpacks ===
U-381 took part in nine wolfpacks, namely:

- Panther (11 – 20 October 1942)
- Veilchen (20 October – 5 November 1942)
- Delphin (26 December 1942 – 14 February 1943)
- Adler (11 – 13 April 1943)
- Meise (13 – 27 April 1943)
- Star (27 April – 4 May 1943)
- Fink (4 – 6 May 1943)
- Inn (11 – 15 May 1943)
- Donau 1 (15 – 21 May 1943)

== Bibliography ==
- Busch, Rainer; Röll, Hans-Joachim (1999). German U-boat commanders of World War II : a biographical dictionary. Translated by Brooks, Geoffrey. London, Annapolis, Md: Greenhill Books, Naval Institute Press. ISBN 1-55750-186-6.
- Busch, Rainer; Röll, Hans-Joachim (1999). Deutsche U-Boot-Verluste von September 1939 bis Mai 1945 [German U-boat losses from September 1939 to May 1945]. Der U-Boot-Krieg (in German). Vol. IV. Hamburg, Berlin, Bonn: Mittler. ISBN 3-8132-0514-2.
- Edwards, Bernard (1996). Dönitz and the Wolf Packs - The U-boats at War. Cassell Military Classics. p. 212. ISBN 0-304-35203-9.
- Gröner, Erich; Jung, Dieter; Maass, Martin (1991). U-boats and Mine Warfare Vessels. German Warships 1815–1945. Vol. 2. Translated by Thomas, Keith; Magowan, Rachel. London: Conway Maritime Press. ISBN 0-85177-593-4.
