= K225 =

K225 or K-225 may refer to:

- K-225 (Kansas highway), a former state highway in Kansas
- Kaman K-225, an American experimental helicopter
- HMCS Kitchener (K225), a former Canadian Navy ship
