= HMS Drury =

Frigate of the Royal Navy

History

United Kingdom
- Name: HMS Drury
- Builder: Philadelphia Navy Yard, Philadelphia, Pennsylvania
- Laid down: 12 February 1942
- Launched: 24 July 1942
- Commissioned: 12 April 1943
- Renamed: Planned as HMS Cockburn; Renamed HMS Drury before launching
- Identification: Pennant number: K316
- Fate: Returned to United States Navy, 20 August 1945

United States
- Name: USS Drury
- Commissioned: 20 August 1945
- Decommissioned: 22 October 1945
- Stricken: 16 November 1945
- Fate: Sold for scrapping, June 1946

General characteristics
- Class & type: Captain-class frigate
- Displacement: 1,190 long tons (1,210 t) (standard)
- Length: 289 ft 5 in (88.2 m)
- Beam: 35 ft 2 in (10.7 m)
- Draught: 10 ft 1 in (3.1 m)
- Installed power: 6,000 shp (4,500 kW) electric motors
- Propulsion: 2 shafts; 4 diesel engines
- Speed: 20 knots (37 km/h; 23 mph)
- Range: 6,000 nmi (11,000 km; 6,900 mi) at 12 knots (22 km/h; 14 mph)
- Complement: 198
- Sensors & processing systems: SA & SL type radars; Type 144 series Asdic; MF Direction Finding; HF Direction Finding
- Armament: 3 × single 3 in (76 mm)/50 Mk 22 guns; 1 × twin Bofors 40 mm; 9 × single 20 mm Oerlikon guns; 1 × Hedgehog anti-submarine mortar; 2 × Depth charge rails and four throwers

HMS Drury was a Captain-class frigate, originally commissioned to be built for the United States Navy as an Evarts-class destroyer escort. Before she was finished in 1942, she was transferred to the Royal Navy under the terms of Lend-Lease, and saw service during the Second World War. She has been the only ship of the Royal Navy to be named Drury, after Captain Thomas Drury, commander of HMS Alfred in the West Indies in 1795.

== Description ==
The Evarts-class ships had an overall length of 289 feet 5 inches (88.2 m), a beam of 35 feet 2 inches (10.7 m), and a draught of 10 feet 1 inch (3.1 m) at full load. They displaced 1,190 long tons (1,210 t) at (standard) and 1,416 long tons (1,439 t) at full load. The ships had a diesel–electric powertrain derived from a submarine propulsion system with four General Motors 16-cylinder diesel engines providing power to four General Electric electric generators which sent electricity to four 1,500-shaft-horsepower (1,100 kW) General Electric electric motors which drove the two propeller shafts. The destroyer escorts had enough power give them a speed of 20 knots (37 km/h; 23 mph) and enough fuel oil to give them a range of 6,000 nautical miles (11,000 km; 6,900 mi) at 12 knots (22 km/h; 14 mph). Their crew consisted of 198 officers and ratings.

The armament of the Evarts-class ships in British service consisted of three single mounts for 50-caliber 3-inch (76 mm)/50 Mk 22 dual-purpose guns; one superfiring pair forward of the bridge and the third gun aft of the superstructure. Anti-aircraft defence was intended to consisted of a twin-gun mount for 40-millimetre (1.6 in) Bofors anti-aircraft (AA) guns atop the rear superstructure with nine 20-millimetre (0.8 in) Oerlikon AA guns located on the superstructure, but production shortages meant that that not all guns were fitted, or that additional Oerlikons replaced the Bofors guns. A Mark 10 Hedgehog anti-submarine mortar was positioned just behind the forward gun. The ships were also equipped with two depth charge rails at the stern and four "K-gun" depth charge throwers.

== Construction and career ==
She was originally to have been named HMS Cockburn, but the name was changed to HMS Drury prior to her launch on 24 July 1942 by the Philadelphia Navy Yard, Philadelphia, Pennsylvania. She was commissioned into the Royal Navy on 12 April 1943 and spent her wartime career on anti-submarine patrols and as a convoy escort. On 21 April 1945 Drury, Bazely and HMS Bentinck sank U-636 west of Ireland.

Drury was transferred back to the US Navy on 20 August 1945 at Chatham, England. She was commissioned the same day. She departed Chatham on 28 August, joined Task Group 21.3 off Dover, and the following day sailed for the States. Drury arrived at Philadelphia, Pennsylvania, on 8 September and remained there at the Philadelphia Navy Yard where she was decommissioned on 22 October 1945. She was scrapped in June 1946.
