= HMS Snowflake =

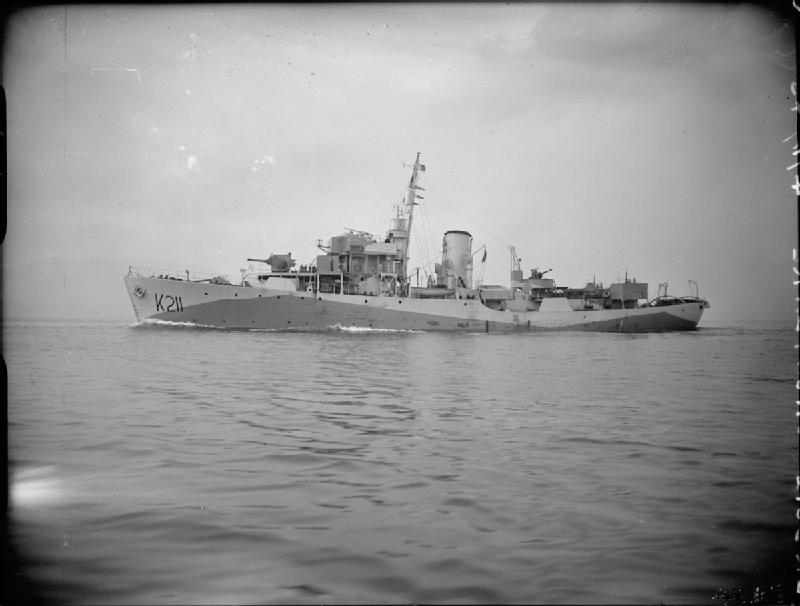
HMS Snowflake seen underway during the Second World War

HMS Snowflake (K211) was a Flower-class corvette that served in the Royal Navy during the Second World War. The ship participated in both the Battle of the Atlantic and the Arctic convoys of World War II.

== Construction ==
The ship was ordered 3 Aug 1940 and laid down at Smith's Dock Company on 19 May 1941. The ship was launched 22 Aug 1941.

== Career ==
The ship was commissioned 2 Nov 1941.

In April and May 1943, the ship was assigned to Convoy ONS 5. During this convoy, the ship commenced a depth charge attack on an Asdic contact on the evening of the 28th April. The ship remained continuously in action from then on engaging U-boat contacts. During the battle, German submarine U-532 launched six torpedoes at the ship. The closest one missed Snowflake by about 20 yards (18 m). After U-532 dived, Snowflake dropped three depth charges on the initial ASDIC contact and ten depth charges when contact was regained at 2,000 yards (1.8 km). Snowflake regained ASDIC contact at 1,400 yards (1.3 km) and dropped another pattern of ten depth charges. On the morning of 6 May the ship recorded her 10th separate attack on a U-boat.

On 6 May 1943, the ship was engaged in anti-submarine warfare with HMS Sunflower in the Western Atlantic Ocean. On manoeuvring to attack U-125, the submarine which was already damaged was scuttled with Snowflake's intended attack accounting for her sinking.

On 14 May 1943, together with HMS Duncan, the ship inflicted minor damage on the submarines U-304 and U-636. On 19 May 1943, together with HMS Duncan, the ship was credited with the sinking of U-381 following a successful depth charge attack.

However, on 12 June 1943, the ship's Commander reported to the Admiralty that a lack of training in communication procedures was a factor in why more submarines had not been sunk in anti-submarine patrols.

In 1947, the ship was converted for use as a weather ship. She was broken up in Dublin in 1962.
