= German submarine U-636 =

German World War II submarine

History

Nazi Germany
- Name: U-636
- Ordered: 20 January 1941
- Builder: Blohm & Voss, Hamburg
- Yard number: 612
- Laid down: 2 October 1941
- Launched: 25 June 1942
- Commissioned: 20 August 1942
- Fate: Sunk on 21 April 1945

General characteristics
- Class & type: Type VIIC submarine
- Displacement: 769 tonnes (757 long tons) surfaced; 871 t (857 long tons) submerged
- Length: 67.10 m (220 ft 2 in) o/a; 50.50 m (165 ft 8 in) pressure hull
- Beam: 6.20 m (20 ft 4 in) o/a; 4.70 m (15 ft 5 in) pressure hull
- Draught: 4.74 m (15 ft 7 in)
- Installed power: 2,800–3,200 PS (2,100–2,400 kW; 2,800–3,200 bhp) (diesels); 750 PS (550 kW; 740 shp) (electric)
- Propulsion: 2 shafts; 2 × diesel engines; 2 × electric motors
- Speed: 17.7 knots (32.8 km/h; 20.4 mph) surfaced; 7.6 knots (14.1 km/h; 8.7 mph) submerged
- Range: 8,500 nmi (15,700 km; 9,800 mi) at 10 knots (19 km/h; 12 mph) surfaced; 80 nmi (150 km; 92 mi) at 4 knots (7.4 km/h; 4.6 mph) submerged
- Test depth: 230 m (750 ft); Crush depth: 250–295 m (820–968 ft)
- Complement: 4 officers, 40–56 enlisted
- Armament: 5 × 53.3 cm (21 in) torpedo tubes (four bow, one stern); 14 × torpedoes or 26 TMA mines; 1 × 8.8 cm (3.46 in) deck gun (220 rounds); 1 × twin 2 cm (0.79 in) C/30 anti-aircraft gun

Service record
- Part of: 5th U-boat Flotilla; 20 August 1942 – 31 March 1943; 11th U-boat Flotilla; 1 April – 31 October 1943; 13th U-boat Flotilla; 1 November 1943 – 21 April 1945
- Identification codes: M 51 601
- Commanders: Kptlt. Hans Hildebrandt; 20 August 1942 – 14 February 1944; Oblt.z.S. Eberhard Schendel; 15 February 1944 – 21 April 1945
- Operations: 15 patrols: 1st patrol: a. 2 May – 8 June 1943; b. 24 – 27 July 1943; c. 28 – 31 July 1943; 2nd patrol: a. 31 July – 7 August 1943; b. 14 – 16 August 1943; 3rd patrol: a. 17 – 30 August 1943; b. 5 – 9 September 1943; c. 24 – 25 October 1943; d. 27 – 31 October 1943; e. 2 – 3 November 1943; 4th patrol: a. 6 – 17 November 1943; b. 18 – 19 November 1943; c. 21 – 22 November 1943; 5th patrol: 23 November – 27 December 1943; 6th patrol: 30 December 1943 – 8 January 1944; 7th patrol: a. 26 January – 2 February 1944; b. 4 – 5 February 1944; c. 8 – 11 February 1944; d. 31 March – 2 April 1944; 8th patrol: a. 8 April – 3 May 1944; b. 5 – 7 May 1944; c. 23 – 24 June 1944; 9th patrol: a. 27 June – 23 July 1944; b. 24 July 1944; 10th patrol: a. 25 August – 12 September 1944; b. 16 – 18 September 1944; 11th patrol: 25 September – 3 October 1944; 12th patrol: a. 6 October – 12 November 1944; b. 14 – 16 November 1944; 13th patrol: 4 – 16 December 1944; 14th patrol: a. 25 December 1944 – 30 January 1945; b. 1 – 3 February 1945; 15th patrol: 1 – 21 April 1945
- Victories: 1 merchant ship sunk (7,169 GRT)

German submarine U-636 was a Type VIIC U-boat built for Nazi Germany's Kriegsmarine for service during World War II. She was laid down on 2 October 1941 by Blohm & Voss, Hamburg as yard number 612, launched on 25 June 1942 and commissioned on 20 August 1942 under Oberleutnant zur See Hans Hildebrandt.

== Design ==
German Type VIIC submarines were preceded by the shorter Type VIIB submarines. U-636 had a displacement of 769 tonnes (757 long tons) when at the surface and 871 tonnes (857 long tons) while submerged. She had a total length of 67.10 m (220 ft 2 in), a pressure hull length of 50.50 m (165 ft 8 in), a beam of 6.20 m (20 ft 4 in), a height of 9.60 m (31 ft 6 in), and a draught of 4.74 m (15 ft 7 in). The submarine was powered by two Germaniawerft F46 four-stroke, six-cylinder supercharged diesel engines producing a total of 2,800 to 3,200 metric horsepower (2,060 to 2,350 kW; 2,760 to 3,160 shp) for use while surfaced, two Brown, Boveri & Cie GG UB 720/8 double-acting electric motors producing a total of 750 metric horsepower (550 kW; 740 shp) for use while submerged. She had two shafts and two 1.23 m (4 ft) propellers. The boat was capable of operating at depths of up to 230 metres (750 ft).

The submarine had a maximum surface speed of 17.7 knots (32.8 km/h; 20.4 mph) and a maximum submerged speed of 7.6 knots (14.1 km/h; 8.7 mph). When submerged, the boat could operate for 80 nautical miles (150 km; 92 mi) at 4 knots (7.4 km/h; 4.6 mph); when surfaced, she could travel 8,500 nautical miles (15,700 km; 9,800 mi) at 10 knots (19 km/h; 12 mph). U-636 was fitted with five 53.3 cm (21 in) torpedo tubes (four fitted at the bow and one at the stern), fourteen torpedoes, one 8.8 cm (3.46 in) SK C/35 naval gun, 220 rounds, and one twin 2 cm (0.79 in) C/30 anti-aircraft gun. The boat had a complement of between forty-four and sixty.

== Service history ==
The boat's career began with training at 5th U-boat Flotilla on 20 August 1942, followed by active service on 1 April 1943 as part of the 11th Flotilla, operating from Bergen, Norway. Just six months later, she transferred to 13th Flotilla stationed in Trondheim, Norway, for the remainder of her service.

In 15 patrols she sank one merchant ship, for a total of 7,169 gross register tons (GRT).

On 14 May 1943, after being attacked by depth charges from HMS Duncan and HMS Snowflake (K211) she suffered minor damage.

=== Fate ===
U-636 was sunk on 21 April 1945 in the North Atlantic in position 55°50′N 10°31′W, by depth charges from HMS Bazely, HMS Drury and HMS Bentinck. All hands were lost.

=== Wolfpacks ===
U-636 took part in eleven wolfpacks, namely:

- Iller (12 – 15 May 1943)
- Donau 1 (15 – 26 May 1943)
- Isegrim (1 – 7 January 1944)
- Donner (11 – 20 April 1944)
- Donner & Keil (20 April – 2 May 1944)
- Trutz (28 June – 10 July 1944)
- Dachs (1 – 5 September 1944)
- Zorn (26 September – 1 October 1944)
- Grimm (1 – 2 October 1944)
- Panther (16 October – 10 November 1944)
- Stier (4 – 15 December 1944)

== Summary of raiding history ==
Date	Ship Name	Nationality	Tonnage (GRT)	Fate
6 September 1943	Tbilisi	Soviet Union	7,169	Sunk

== See also ==
- Convoy SC 130

== Bibliography ==
- Busch, Rainer; Röll, Hans-Joachim (1999). German U-boat commanders of World War II : a biographical dictionary. Translated by Brooks, Geoffrey. London, Annapolis, Md: Greenhill Books, Naval Institute Press. ISBN 1-55750-186-6.
- Busch, Rainer; Röll, Hans-Joachim (1999). Der U-Boot-Krieg, 1939-1945: Deutsche U-Boot-Verluste von September 1939 bis Mai 1945 [German U-boat losses from September 1939 to May 1945] (in German). Vol. IV. Hamburg, Berlin, Bonn: Mittler. ISBN 3-8132-0514-2.
- Gröner, Eric; Jung, Dieter; Maass, Martin (1991). German Warships 1815-1945: U-boats and Mine Warfare Vessels. Vol. 2. Translated by Thomas, Keith; Magowan, Rachel. London: Conway Maritime Press. ISBN 0-85177-593-4.
- Sharpe, Peter (1998). U-Boat Fact File. Great Britain: Midland Publishing. ISBN 1-85780-072-9.
