= USCGC Champlain =

Lake-class cutter of the US Coast Guard

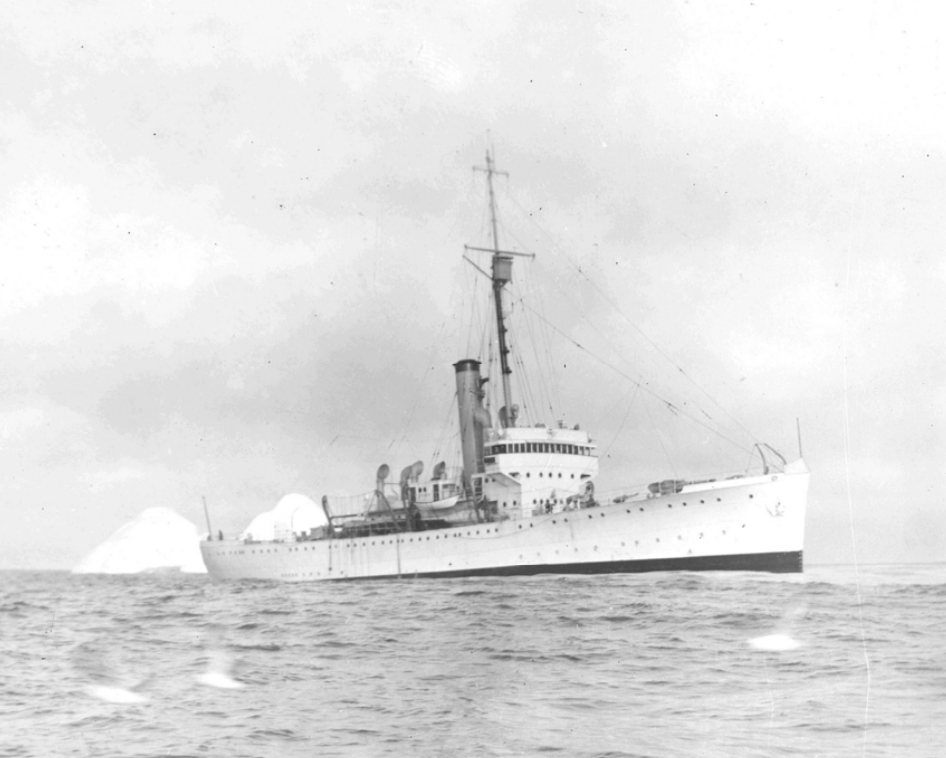
- USCGC Champlain on the International Ice Patrol, circa mid-1930s.

History

United States
- Name: USCGC Champlain (1929)
- Namesake: Lake Champlain
- Builder: Bethlehem Shipbuilding Corporation, Quincy, Mass.
- Laid down: 23 May 1928
- Launched: 11 October 1928
- Commissioned: 24 January 1929
- Decommissioned: 12 May 1941
- Fate: Transferred to Royal Navy

United Kingdom
- Name: HMS Sennen (Y21)
- Commissioned: 12 May 1941
- Fate: Returned to USCG; 27 March 1946

United States
- Name: USCGC Champlain (WPG-319.)
- Fate: Sold to Hughes Brothers, Inc.; 25 March 1948

General characteristics
- Class & type: Lake-class cutter (USCG); Banff-class sloop (RN)
- Displacement: 2,075 long tons (2,108 t)
- Length: 250 ft (76 m)
- Beam: 42 ft (13 m)
- Draft: 12 ft 11 in (3.94 m)
- Propulsion: 1 × General Electric turbine-driven 3,350 shp (2,500 kW) electric motor, 2 boilers
- Speed: 14.8 kn (27.4 km/h; 17.0 mph) cruising; 17.5 kn (32.4 km/h; 20.1 mph) maximum
- Complement: 97
- Armament: 1 × 5 inch gun; 1 × 3 inch gun; 2 × 6-pounder (57 mm)

USCGC Champlain was a Lake-class cutter of the United States Coast Guard, launched on 20 June 1928 and commissioned on 23 March 1929. After 12 years of service with the Coast Guard, she was transferred to the British Royal Navy as part of the Lend-Lease Act.

== Career ==
=== US Coast Guard – Champlain ===
After commissioning in January 1929, Champlain was homeported in Stapleton, New York.

=== Royal Navy – Sennen ===
As part of the Lend-Lease Act she was transferred to the Royal Navy where she was renamed HMS Sennen (Y21) and commissioned on 12 May 1941. On 19 May 1943, Sennen assisted HMS Jed in the sinking of U-954 by depth charges. At the end of the war, in March 1946, she was returned to the USCG.

=== US Coast Guard – Champlain (post-war) ===
Upon her return to the USCG, her original name was restored and she was given the hull number and designation WPG-319. She was then placed into reserve status until March 1948 when she was sold to Hughes Brothers, Inc. of New York.

== See also ==
- List of United States Coast Guard cutters
