= HMCS Kitchener (K225) =

Flower-class corvette

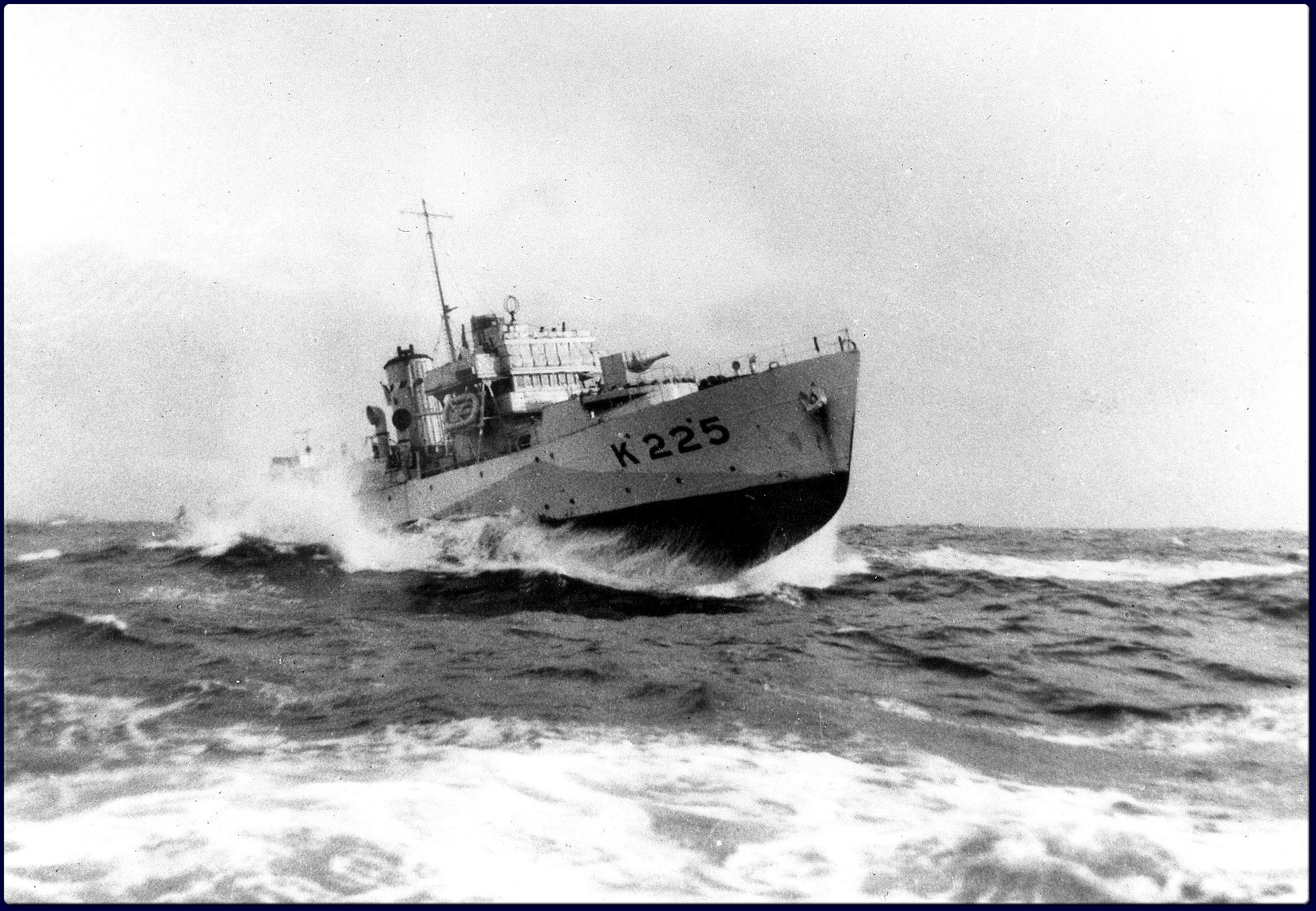
- HMCS Kitchener in heavy seas

History

Canada
- Name: Kitchener
- Namesake: Kitchener, Ontario
- Builder: Davie Shipbuilding, Lauzon
- Laid down: 28 February 1941
- Launched: 18 November 1941
- Commissioned: 28 June 1942
- Decommissioned: 11 July 1945
- Renamed: from HMCS Vancouver before launch.
- Refit: Completed 28 January 1944, Liverpool, Nova Scotia.
- Identification: Pennant number: K225
- Honours and awards: Atlantic 1942-43, Gulf of St. Lawrence 1942, English Channel 1944-45, Normandy 1944
- Fate: Scrapped in 1949, Hamilton, Ontario

General characteristics
- Class & type: Flower-class corvette (Revised)
- Displacement: 925 long tons (940 t; 1,036 short tons)
- Length: 205 ft (62.48 m)o/a
- Beam: 33 ft (10.06 m)
- Draught: 11.5 ft (3.51 m)
- Propulsion: 1940-1941 program; single shaft; 2 × water tube boilers; 1 × double acting triple-expansion reciprocating steam engine; 2,750 ihp (2,050 kW)
- Speed: 16 knots (29.6 km/h)
- Range: 3,500 nautical miles (6,482 km) at 12 knots (22.2 km/h)
- Complement: 85
- Sensors & processing systems: 1 × SW1C or 2C radar; 1 × Type 123A or Type 127DV sonar
- Armament: 1 × BL 4 in (102 mm) Mk.IX gun; 2 × .50 cal machine gun (twin); 2 × Lewis .303 cal machine gun (twin); 2 × Mk.II depth charge throwers; 2 × depth charge rails with 40 depth charges

HMCS Kitchener was a Royal Canadian Navy revised Flower-class corvette which took part in convoy escort duties during the Second World War. She fought primarily in the Battle of the Atlantic. She was named for Kitchener, Ontario. The vessel was originally named HMCS Vancouver but was renamed in November 1941 before the ship was launched.

== Background ==
Flower-class corvettes like Kitchener serving with the Royal Canadian Navy during the Second World War were different from earlier and more traditional sail-driven corvettes. The "corvette" designation was created by the French as a class of small warships; the Royal Navy borrowed the term for a period but discontinued its use in 1877. During the hurried preparations for war in the late 1930s, Winston Churchill reactivated the corvette class, needing a name for smaller ships used in an escort capacity, in this case based on a whaling ship design. The generic name "flower" was used to designate the class of these ships, which – in the Royal Navy – were named after flowering plants.

Corvettes commissioned by the Royal Canadian Navy during the Second World War were named after communities for the most part, to better represent the people who took part in building them. This idea was put forth by Admiral Percy W. Nelles. Sponsors were commonly associated with the community for which the ship was named. Royal Navy corvettes were designed as open sea escorts, while Canadian corvettes were developed for coastal auxiliary roles which was exemplified by their minesweeping gear. Eventually the Canadian corvettes would be modified to allow them to perform better on the open seas.

== Construction ==
Kitchener was ordered as part of the Revised 1940-41 Flower class building program. This revised program radically changed the look of the Flower-class corvette. The ships of this program kept the water-tube boilers of the initial 1940-41 program, but now they were housed in separate compartments for safety. The fo'c'sle was extended, which allowed more space for berths for the crew, leading to an expansion of the crew. The bow had increased flare for better control in heavy seas. The revised Flowers of the RCN received an additional two depth charge throwers fitted amidships and more depth charges. They also came with heavier secondary armament with 20-millimetre anti-aircraft guns carried on the extended bridge wings. All this led to an increase in displacement, draught and length.

Kitchener was laid down by George T. Davie & Sons Ltd. at Lauzon on 28 February 1941 and launched on 18 November of that year. She was commissioned into the RCN on 28 June 1942 at Quebec City. During her career, she had one significant refit, taking place at Liverpool, Nova Scotia from October 1943 until 28 January 1944.

== War service ==
After arriving on 16 July 1942 at Halifax Kitchener spent the next six weeks at Pictou, Nova Scotia working up.

In September she was briefly assigned to the Western Local Escort Force (WLEF) before being reassigned as an escort for Operation Torch, the Allied invasion of North Africa. She sailed to Derry, arriving on 3 November and spent the next few months escorting convoys between the UK and the Mediterranean before returning to Canada in April 1943 as an escort for convoy ONS 2.

She was briefly assigned to the Western Support Force but in June was reassigned to Escort Group C-5 of the Mid-Ocean Escort Force where she made three round trips to Derry. An extensive refit in Liverpool, Nova Scotia was completed on 28 January 1944 and after two weeks working up in Bermuda the ship transferred to Milford Haven, Wales for escort duties associated with Operation Neptune.

Kitchener was the only Canadian corvette to participate in the 6 June D-Day invasion of Normandy, escorting the second wave of American infantry which landed at around 11 am on Omaha Beach, then assigned as picket ship for the heavy cruiser USS Augusta, which was acting as General Omar Bradley's command ship. From August 1944 until May 1945 she was a member of Escort Group 41 based at Plymouth, England.

HMCS Kitchener appeared in the film Corvette K225 (1943) as the fictional HMCS Donnacona. Certain scenes for the film were shot at Halifax, Nova Scotia, where HMCS Kitchener was based at the time.

== Post-war service ==
After the cessation of hostilities Kitchener returned to Canada in May 1945. She was paid off at Sorel-Tracy, Quebec 11 July 1945 and transferred to the War Assets Corporation for disposal. She was sold in April 1949 for scrapping and broken up at Hamilton, Ontario.
