= HMS Jed (1942) =

1942 River-class frigate of the Royal Navy

History

United Kingdom
- Name: Jed
- Namesake: Jed River
- Ordered: 11 February 1941
- Builder: Charles Hill & Sons & Belliss & Morcom
- Laid down: 27 September 1941
- Launched: 30 July 1942
- Commissioned: 30 November 1942
- Fate: Placed into reserve in 1946. Broken up on 25 May 1957.

General characteristics
- Class & type: River-class frigate
- Displacement: 1,370 long tons (1,390 t); 1,830 long tons (1,860 t) (deep load)
- Length: 283 ft (86.26 m) p/p; 301.25 ft (91.82 m)o/a
- Beam: 36.5 ft (11.13 m)
- Draught: 9 ft (2.74 m); 13 ft (3.96 m) (deep load)
- Propulsion: 2 × Admiralty 3-drum boilers, 2 shafts, reciprocating vertical triple expansion, 5,500 ihp (4,100 kW)
- Speed: 20 knots (37.0 km/h)
- Range: 7,200 nautical miles (13,334 km) at 12 knots (22.2 km/h), with 440 long tons (450 t; 490 short tons) of oil
- Complement: 107
- Armament: 2 × QF 4-inch (102 mm) Mk.XIX guns, single mounts CP Mk.XXIII; up to 10 × QF 20 mm Oerlikon AA guns on twin mounts Mk.V and single mounts Mk.III; 1 × Hedgehog 24 spigot A/S projector; up to 150 depth charges

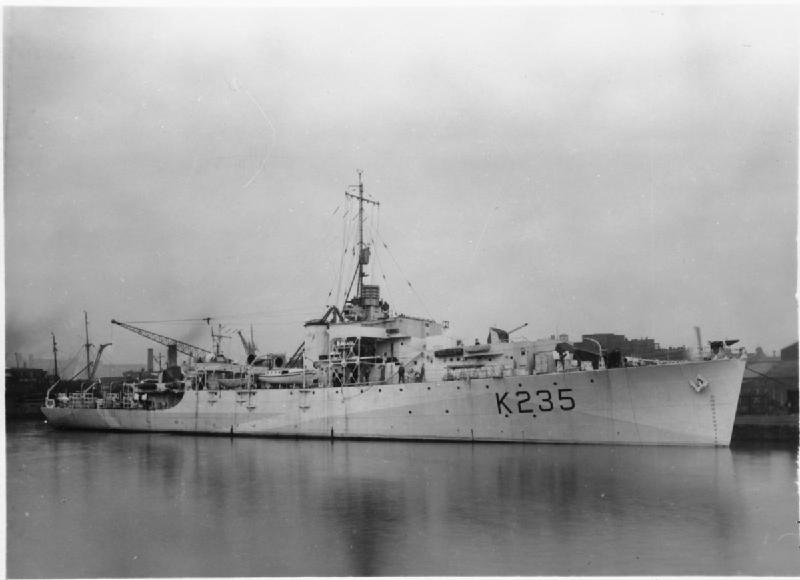
HMS Jed docked in December 1942

HMS Jed (K235) was a River-class frigate of the Royal Navy (RN). Jed was built by Charles Hill & Sons & Belliss & Morcom in Bristol, England for the Royal Navy. She served during World War II.

Jed was one of 151 River-class frigates launched between 1941 and 1944 for use as anti-submarine convoy escorts, named after rivers in the United Kingdom. The ships were designed by naval engineer William Reed, of Smith's Dock Company of South Bank-on-Tees, to have the endurance and anti-submarine capabilities of the Black Swan-class sloops, while being quick and cheap to build in civil dockyards using the machinery (e.g. reciprocating steam engines instead of turbines) and construction techniques pioneered in the building of the Flower-class corvettes. Its purpose was to improve on the convoy escort classes in service with the Royal Navy at the time, including the Flower class.

On 19 May 1943, Jed was involved in a large-scale convoy defence against a reported 20 to 30 German U-boats. During the defense she located U-954 and together with the sloop HMS Sennen, sank the submarine with depth charges southeast of Cape Farewell, Greenland.

One month later on 14 June 1943 Jed and the sloop HMS Pelican attacked and sunk U-334 with depth charges, southwest of Iceland in the North Atlantic.
