= List of U-boats never deployed =

During the Second World War, the German Navy built over a thousand U-boats or submarines for service in the Battle of the Atlantic and elsewhere. Although the majority of these had active service careers, and 784 of them were lost at sea, there were still several hundred boats which were never completed or completed too late to see any war service. These boats were sometime solely commissioned as training craft, or were too badly damaged by bombing to be worth completion. Most however were finished in the last six months of the war and never had time or enough fuel to complete their training programs. These boats remained in German harbours up until April/May 1945, when most were taken out to sea by skeleton crews and scuttled to prevent the allies capturing them. The boats that were captured were taken by the Allies to Loch Ryan in Scotland and Lisahally in Northern Ireland. Some were presented to allied navies for commissioning or experiments, but the majority of captured U-boats were towed out to sea in the autumn of 1945 and sunk by gunfire in Operation Deadlight.

== U-11 ==
- Type: IIB
- Construction
  - Laid Down: May 6, 1935
  - Launched: August 27, 1935
  - Commissioned: September 21, 1935
  - Shipyard: Germaniawerft, Kiel
- Commander
  - Hans Rudolf Rösing
  - Viktor Schütze
  - Georg Peters
  - Gottfried Stolzenburg
  - Günter Dobenecker
- Fate: Mainly served as a school and training boat, but did carry out trials for the Alberich anechoic tiles in 1940. Laid up at Gotenhafen on December 14, 1944. Towed to Kiel and decommissioned on January 5, 1945. Scuttled at the Arsenal in Kiel on May 5, 1945. Wreck broken up in 1947.
- U-boat.net webpage for U-11

== U-80 ==
- Type: VIIC
- Construction
  - Laid Down: April 17, 1940
  - Launched: February 11, 1941
  - Commissioned: April 8, 1941
  - Shipyard: Bremer Vulkan, Bremen-Vegesack
- Commander
  - Georg Staats
  - Hans Benker
  - Oskar Curio
  - Hans-Adolf Isermeyer
  - Hans Keerl
- Fate: Served as a training boat. Sunk in the Baltic Sea west of Pillau (now Baltiysk) in a diving accident on November 28, 1944.
- U-boat.net webpage for U-80

== U-112 ==
- Type: XIB
- Construction
  - Laid Down:
  - Launched:
  - Commissioned:
  - Shipyard: AG Weser, Bremen
- Commander
- Fate: Construction suspended on September 15, 1939, and cancelled in May 1940. Some sources claim that U-112 was completed and sailed against the US in 1945 and sunk there with all hands, but there is no evidence to support this claim.
- U-boat.net webpage for U-112

== U-113 ==
- Type: XIB
- Construction
  - Laid Down:
  - Launched:
  - Commissioned:
  - Shipyard: AG Weser, Bremen
- Commander
- Fate: Construction suspended on September 15, 1939, and cancelled in May 1940.
- U-boat.net webpage for U-113

== U-114 ==
- Type: XIB
- Construction
  - Laid Down:
  - Launched:
  - Commissioned:
  - Shipyard: AG Weser, Bremen
- Commander
- Fate: Construction suspended on September 15, 1939, and cancelled in May 1940.
- U-boat.net webpage for U-114

== U-115 ==
- Type: XIB
- Construction
  - Laid Down:
  - Launched:
  - Commissioned:
  - Shipyard: AG Weser, Bremen
- Commander
- Fate: Construction suspended on September 15, 1939, and cancelled in May 1940.
- U-boat.net webpage for U-115

== U-120 ==
- Type: IIB
- Construction
  - Laid Down: March 31, 1938
  - Launched: March 16, 1940
  - Commissioned: April 20, 1940
  - Shipyard: Flender Werke, Lübeck
- Commander
  - Ernst Bauer
  - Wolfgang Heyda
  - Willy-Roderich Körner
  - Hans Fiedler
  - Alfred Radermacher
  - Adolf Gundlach
  - Joachim Sauerbier
  - Rolf Rüdiger Bensel
- Fate: Originally built for the Republic of China, but when Japan complained, it was turned over to the Kriegsmarine instead, serving as a training boat in the 21st Flotilla and then the 31st Flotilla. Scuttled at Wesermünde on May 5, 1945. Raised and broken up between October 1949 and November 1950.
- U-boat.net webpage for U-120

== U-121 ==
- Type: IIB
- Construction
  - Laid Down: April 16, 1938
  - Launched: April 20, 1940
  - Commissioned: 28 May 1940
  - Shipyard: Flender Werke, Lübeck
- Commander
  - Karl-Ernst Schroeter
  - Otto Harms
  - Adalbert Schnee
  - Egon Reiner Freiherr von Schlippenbach
  - Gert Hetschko
  - Ernst von Witzendorff
  - Otto Westphalen
  - Otto Hübschen
  - Ewald Hülsenbeck
  - Friedrich Horst
- Fate: Originally built for the Republic of China, but when Japan complained, it was turned over to the Kriegsmarine instead, serving as a training boat in the 21st, 24th, and 31st flotillas. Scuttled at Alten Hafen in Wesermünde on May 5, 1945. Raised November 2, 1949 and broken up.
- U-boat.net webpage for U-120

== U-148 ==
- Type: IID
- Construction
  - Laid Down: April 10, 1940
  - Launched: November 16, 1940
  - Commissioned: December 28, 1940
  - Shipyard: Deutsche Werft, Kiel
- Commander
  - Hans-Jürgen Radke
  - Eberhard Mohr
  - Rudolf Heinz Franke
  - Herbert Brüninghaus
  - Goske von Möllendorff
  - Heinz Schäffer
  - Renko Tammen
- Fate: Served as a training boat. Scuttled in the Raederschleuse (lock) at Wilhelmshaven on May 5, 1945. Later broken up.
- U-boat.net webpage for U-148

== U-150 ==
- Type: IID
- Construction
  - Laid Down: May 25, 1940
  - Launched: October 19, 1940
  - Commissioned: November 17, 1940
  - Shipyard: Deutsche Werft, Kiel
- Commander
  - Hinrich Kelling
  - Hermann Schultz
  - Emil Ranzau
  - Hunold von Ahlefeld
  - Hans-Helmut Anschütz
  - Jürgen Kriegshammer
- Fate: Served as a training boat. Surrendered on May 5, 1945, at Heligoland, Germany. Transferred to Loch Ryan from Wilhelmshaven on June 30, 1945, for Operation Deadlight. Sunk on December 21, 1945, by gunfire from HMS Onslaught and HMS Powey.
- U-boat.net webpage for U-150

== U-151 ==
- Type: IID
- Construction
  - Laid Down: July 6, 1940
  - Launched: December 14, 1940
  - Commissioned: January 15, 1941
  - Shipyard: Deutsche Werft, Kiel
- Commander
  - Hans Oestermann
  - Gustav-Adolf Janssen
  - Kurt Eichmann
  - Paul Just
  - Karl-Erich Utischill
  - Ferdinand Graf von Arco
- Fate: Served as a training boat. Scuttled in the Raederschleuse (lock) at Wilhelmshaven on May 5, 1945. Later broken up.
- U-boat.net webpage for U-151

== U-152 ==
- Type: IID
- Construction
  - Laid Down: July 6, 1940
  - Launched: December 14, 1940
  - Commissioned: January 29, 1941
  - Shipyard: Deutsche Werft, Kiel
- Commander
  - Peter-Erich Cremer
  - Werner Bender
  - Hans Hildebrandt
  - Hans-Ferdinand Geisler
  - Victor-Wilhelm Nonn
  - Wilhelm Bergemann
  - Gernot Thiel
- Fate: Served as a training boat. Scuttled in the Raederschleuse (lock) at Wilhelmshaven on May 5, 1945. Later broken up.
- U-boat.net webpage for U-152

== U-222 ==
- Type: VIIC
- Construction
  - Laid Down: June 16, 1941
  - Launched: March 28, 1942
  - Commissioned: May 23, 1942
  - Shipyard: Germaniawerft, Kiel
- Commander
  - Ralf von Jessen
- Fate: Served as a training boat in the 8th Flotilla. Sunk in the Baltic Sea west of Pillau (now Baltiysk) September 2, 1942 following a collision with U-626.
- U-boat.net webpage for U-222

== U-236 ==
- Type: VIIC
- Construction
  - Laid Down: March 23, 1942
  - Launched: November 24, 1942
  - Commissioned: January 9, 1943
  - Shipyard: Germaniawerft, Kiel
- Commander
  - Reimar Ziesmer
  - Curt Hartmann
  - Ludo Kregelin
  - Herbert Mumm
- Fate: Served as a training boat in the 5th, 24th, 21st, and 31st flotillas. Sunk inside pontoon No. 5 at the Germaniawerft shipyard on May 14, 1943, during a US air raid. Raised on May 22, 1943, repaired, and returned to service on September 22, 1943. Scuttled in the Baltic Sea west of Schleimünde on May 5, 1945, following an attack by RAF Typhoon aircraft the day before.
- U-boat.net webpage for U-236

== U-237 ==
- Type: VIIC
- Construction
  - Laid Down: April 23, 1942
  - Launched: December 17, 1942
  - Commissioned: January 30, 1943
  - Shipyard: Germaniawerft, Kiel
- Commander
  - Hubert Nordheimer
  - Lothar König
  - Johannes van Stipriaan
  - Karl-Heinz Menard
- Fate: Served as a training boat in the 5th Flotilla. Sunk inside pontoon No. 5 at the Germaniawerft shipyard on May 14, 1943, during a US air raid. Raised on May 26, 1943, repaired, and returned to service on October 8, 1943, serving in the 23rd Flotilla as a trials boat. Sunk at the fitting out quay at Germaniawerft on April 4, 1945, during a US bombing raid.
- U-boat.net webpage for U-237

== U-239 ==
- Type: VIIC
- Construction
  - Laid Down: May 14, 1942
  - Launched: January 28, 1942
  - Commissioned: March 28, 1943
  - Shipyard: Germaniawerft, Kiel
- Commander
  - Ulrich Vöge
- Fate: Served as a training and school boat with the 5th and 23th flotillas. Decommissioned on August 5, 1944, and broken up after being badly damaged at the Deutsche Werke shipyard during a British bombing raid on July 24, 1944.
- U-boat.net webpage for U-239

== U-272 ==
- Type: VIIC
- Construction
  - Laid Down: November 28, 1941
  - Launched: August 15, 1942
  - Commissioned: October 7, 1942
  - Shipyard: Bremer Vulkan, Bremen-Vegesack
- Commander
  - Horst Hepp
- Fate: Served as a training boat in the 8th Flotilla. Sunk in the Baltic Sea off Hela on November 12, 1942, following a collision with U-634.
- U-boat.net webpage for U-272

== U-291 ==
- Type: VIIC
- Construction
  - Laid Down: October 17, 1942
  - Launched: June 30, 1943
  - Commissioned: August 4, 1943
  - Shipyard: Bremer Vulkan, Bremen-Vegesack
- Commander
  - Hans Keerl
  - Friedrich Stege
  - Hermann Neumeister
- Fate: Served as a training boat in the 21st and 31st flotillas and as a trials boat in the 23rd Flotilla. Surrendered May 5, 1945 at Cuxhaven, Germany. Transferred to Loch Ryan, Scotland from Wilhelmshaven on June 24, 1945. Sunk by gunfire from HMS Onslaught on December 20, 1945, as part of Operation Deadlight.
- U-boat.net webpage for U-272

== U-298 ==
- Type: VIIC/41
- Construction
  - Laid Down: February 23, 1943
  - Launched: October 25, 1943
  - Commissioned: December 1, 1943
  - Shipyard: Bremer Vulkan, Bremen-Vegesack
- Commander
  - Ortwin Hensellek
  - Otto Hohmann
  - Heinrich Gehrken
- Fate: Served as a training boat in the 8th Flotilla before serving as a school boat in the U-Abwehrschule (U-Boat School). Surrendered May 9, 1945 at Bergen, Norway. Transferred to Loch Ryan, Scotland on May 30, 1945. Sunk by shellfire from HMS Onslow and Cubitt on November 29, 1945, as part of Operation Deadlight.
- U-boat.net webpage for U-298

== U-316 ==
- Type: VIIC
- Construction
  - Laid Down: August 11, 1942
  - Launched: June 19, 1943
  - Commissioned: August 5, 1943
  - Shipyard: Flender Werke, Lübeck
- Commander
  - Hermann Stuckmann
  - Gottfried König
- Fate: Served as a school boat in the 22nd and 23rd flotillas before serving as a training boat in the 31st Flotilla. Scuttled on May 2, 1945, near Travemünde. Later broken up.
- U-boat.net webpage for U-316

== U-323 ==
- Type: VIIC/41
- Construction
  - Laid Down: March 12, 1943
  - Launched: January 12, 1944
  - Commissioned: March 2, 1944
  - Shipyard: Flender Werke, Lübeck
- Commander
  - Max Bokelberg
  - Siegfried Pregel
  - Hans-Jürgen Dobinsky
- Fate: Served as a school boat in the 4th Flotilla. Scuttled on May 5, 1945, at Nordenham as part of Operation Regenbogen. Later broken up.
- U-boat.net webpage for U-323

== U-329 ==
- Type: VIIC/41
- Construction
  - Laid Down: July 15, 1943
  - Launched:
  - Commissioned:
  - Shipyard: Flender Werke, Lübeck
- Commander
- Fate: Construction suspended on September 30, 1943. Cancelled on July 20, 1944, and broken up.
- U-boat.net webpage for U-329

== U-330 ==
- Type: VIIC/41
- Construction
  - Laid Down: August 3, 1943
  - Launched:
  - Commissioned:
  - Shipyard: Flender Werke, Lübeck
- Commander
- Fate: Construction suspended on September 30, 1943. Cancelled on July 20, 1944, and broken up.
- U-boat.net webpage for U-330

== U-345 ==
- Type: VIIC
- Construction
  - Laid Down: July 9, 1942
  - Launched: March 11, 1943
  - Commissioned: May 4, 1943
  - Shipyard: Nordseewerke, Emden
- Commander
  - Ulrich Knackfuß
- Fate: Served as a training boat in the 8th Flotilla. Decommissioned on December 23, 1943, at the Howaldtswerke shipyard in Kiel following a US bombing raid on December 13. Sank under tow in the Baltic Sea off Warnemünde on February 2, 1944. Raised in April 1953 and broken up at Stralsund.
- U-boat.net webpage for U-345

== U-346 ==
- Type: VIIC
- Construction
  - Laid Down: October 28, 1942
  - Launched: April 13, 1943
  - Commissioned: June 7, 1943
  - Shipyard: Nordseewerke, Emden
- Commander
  - Arno Leisten
- Fate: Served as a training boat in the 8th Flotilla. Sunk on September 20, 1943, in the Baltic Sea off Hela in a diving accident.
- U-boat.net webpage for U-346

== U-349 ==
- Type: VIIC
- Construction
  - Laid Down: December 29, 1942
  - Launched: July 22, 1943
  - Commissioned: September 8, 1943
  - Shipyard: Nordseewerke, Emden
- Commander
  - Ernst Lottner
  - Wolfgang Dähne
- Fate: Served as a school boat in the 22nd and 23rd flotillas and then as a training boat in the 31st Flotilla. Scuttled in Gelting Bay on May 5, 1945, as part of Operation Regenbogen; Obermaschinist Wilhelm Hegenbarth refused to leave the boat and died in the explosion. Broken up in 1948.
- U-boat.net webpage for U-349

== U-350 ==
- Type: VIIC
- Construction
  - Laid Down: December 29, 1942
  - Launched: July 22, 1943
  - Commissioned: September 8, 1943
  - Shipyard: Nordseewerke, Emden
- Commander
  - Ernst Lottner
  - Wolfgang Dähne
- Fate: Served as a training boat in the 22nd and 31st flotillas. Sank March 30, 1945 inside pontoon dock near the Fink II U-boat pen at Hamburg-Finkelwerder during a US bombing raid. Later broken up.
- U-boat.net webpage for U-350

== U-351 ==
- Type: VIIC
- Construction
  - Laid Down: March 4, 1940
  - Launched: March 27, 1941
  - Commissioned: June 20, 1941
  - Shipyard: Flensburger Schiffsbau-Ges, Flensburg
- Commander
  - Karl Hause
  - Günther Rosenberg
  - Eberhard Zimmermann
  - Götz Roth
  - Helmut Wicke
  - Hans-Jürgen Schley
  - Hugo Strehl
- Fate: Served as a training boat in the 26th and 24th flotillas, as a school boat in the 22nd Flotilla, and finally as a training boat in the 4th Flotilla. Scuttled May 4, 1945 in Hørup Hav. Broken up in 1948.
- U-boat.net webpage for U-351

== U-395 ==
- Type: VIIC
- Construction
  - Laid Down: June 10, 1942
  - Launched: July 16, 1943
  - Commissioned:
  - Shipyard: Howaldtswerke, Kiel
- Commander
- Fate: Bombed while being fitted out on July 29, 1943, and left unfinished.
- U-boat.net webpage for U-395

== U-474 ==
- Type: VIIC
- Construction
  - Laid Down: December 18, 1941
  - Launched: April 17, 1943
  - Commissioned:
  - Shipyard: Deutsche Werft, Kiel
- Commander
- Fate: Sunk by bombs during an air raid on May 14, 1943. It was raised and 95% repaired in 1945, but was scuttled on May 3, 1945.
- U-boat.net webpage for U-474

== U-491 ==
- Type: XIV
- Construction
  - Laid Down: July 13, 1943
  - Launched:
  - Commissioned:
  - Shipyard: Deutsche Werft, Kiel
- Commander
- Fate: Was 75% complete when construction was halted in 1944. Further construction halted on September 23, 1944, and broken up.
- U-boat.net webpage for U-491

== U-492 ==
- Type: XIV
- Construction
  - Laid Down: August 21, 1943
  - Launched:
  - Commissioned:
  - Shipyard: Deutsche Werft, Kiel
- Commander
- Fate: Was 75% complete when construction was halted in 1944. Further construction halted on September 23, 1944, and broken up.
- U-boat.net webpage for U-492

== U-493 ==
- Type: XIV
- Construction
  - Laid Down: September 25, 1943
  - Launched:
  - Commissioned:
  - Shipyard: Deutsche Werft, Kiel
- Commander
- Fate: Was 75% complete when construction was halted in 1944. Further construction halted on September 23, 1944, and broken up.
- U-boat.net webpage for U-493

== U-494 ==
- Type: XIV
- Construction
  - Laid Down: November 1, 1943
  - Launched:
  - Commissioned:
  - Shipyard: Germaniawerft, Kiel
- Commander
- Fate: Construction cancelled September 23, 1944 and broken up.
- U-boat.net webpage for U-494

== U-495 ==
- Type: XIV
- Construction
  - Laid Down: November 12, 1943
  - Launched:
  - Commissioned:
  - Shipyard: Germaniawerft, Kiel
- Commander
- Fate: Construction cancelled on September 23, 1944, and broken up.
- U-boat.net webpage for U-495

== U-496 ==
- Type: XIV
- Construction
  - Laid Down: February 8, 1944
  - Launched:
  - Commissioned:
  - Shipyard: Germaniawerft, Kiel
- Commander
- Fate: Construction cancelled on September 23, 1944, and broken up.
- U-boat.net webpage for U-496

== U-497 ==
- Type: XIV
- Construction
  - Laid Down: 1944
  - Launched:
  - Commissioned:
  - Shipyard: Germaniawerft, Kiel
- Commander
- Fate: Construction cancelled on September 23, 1944, and broken up.
- U-boat.net webpage for U-497

== U-684 ==
- Type: VIIC
- Construction
  - Laid Down: March 4, 1943
  - Launched: April 1944
  - Commissioned:
  - Shipyard: Howaldtswerke, Kiel
- Commander
- Fate: Never finished and scuttled in front of the Elbe II bunker in Hamburg on May 3, 1945.
- U-boat.net webpage for U-684

== U-685 ==
- Type: VIIC
- Construction
  - Laid Down: March 8, 1943
  - Launched: April 1944
  - Commissioned:
  - Shipyard: Howaldtswerke, Kiel
- Commander
- Fate: Never finished and scuttled in front of the Elbe II bunker in Hamburg on May 3, 1945.
- U-boat.net webpage for U-685

== U-686 ==
- Type: VIIC
- Construction
  - Laid Down: May 13, 1943
  - Launched:
  - Commissioned:
  - Shipyard: Howaldtswerke, Kiel
- Commander
- Fate: Never finished. Cancelled on September 23, 1944.
- U-boat.net webpage for U-686

== U-687 ==
- Type: VIIC/41
- Construction
  - Laid Down: May 13, 1943
  - Launched:
  - Commissioned:
  - Shipyard: Howaldtswerke, Kiel
- Commander
- Fate: Construction suspended on November 3, 1943, and cancelled on July 22, 1944.
- U-boat.net webpage for U-687

== U-688 ==
- Type: VIIC/41
- Construction
  - Laid Down: July 12, 1943
  - Launched:
  - Commissioned:
  - Shipyard: Howaldtswerke, Kiel
- Commander
- Fate: Never finished. Construction suspended on September 30, 1943, and cancelled on July 22, 1944.
- U-boat.net webpage for U-688

== U-689 ==
- Type: VIIC/41
- Construction
  - Laid Down: July 13, 1943
  - Launched:
  - Commissioned:
  - Shipyard: Howaldtswerke, Kiel
- Commander
- Fate: Never finished. Construction suspended on September 30, 1943, and cancelled on July 22, 1944.
- U-boat.net webpage for U-689

== U-690 ==
- Type: VIIC/41
- Construction
  - Laid Down:
  - Launched:
  - Commissioned:
  - Shipyard: Howaldtswerke, Kiel
- Commander
- Fate: Construction suspended on September 30, 1943, and cancelled on July 22, 1944.
- U-boat.net webpage for U-690

== U-691 ==
- Type: VIIC/41
- Construction
  - Laid Down:
  - Launched:
  - Commissioned:
  - Shipyard: Howaldtswerke, Kiel
- Commander
- Fate: Construction suspended on September 30, 1943, and cancelled on July 22, 1944.
- U-boat.net webpage for U-691

== U-692 ==
- Type: VIIC/41
- Construction
  - Laid Down:
  - Launched:
  - Commissioned:
  - Shipyard: Howaldtswerke, Kiel
- Commander
- Fate: Construction suspended on September 30, 1943, and cancelled on July 22, 1944.
- U-boat.net webpage for U-692

== U-693 ==
- Type: VIIC/41
- Construction
  - Laid Down:
  - Launched:
  - Commissioned:
  - Shipyard: Howaldtswerke, Kiel
- Commander
- Fate: Construction suspended on September 30, 1943, and cancelled on July 22, 1944.
- U-boat.net webpage for U-693

== U-694 ==
- Type: VIIC/41
- Construction
  - Laid Down:
  - Launched:
  - Commissioned:
  - Shipyard: Howaldtswerke, Kiel
- Commander
- Fate: Construction suspended on September 30, 1943, and cancelled on July 22, 1944.
- U-boat.net webpage for U-694

== U-695 ==
- Type: VIIC/41
- Construction
  - Laid Down:
  - Launched:
  - Commissioned:
  - Shipyard: Howaldtswerke, Kiel
- Commander
- Fate: Construction suspended on September 30, 1943, and cancelled on July 22, 1944.
- U-boat.net webpage for U-695

== U-696 ==
- Type: VIIC/41
- Construction
  - Laid Down:
  - Launched:
  - Commissioned:
  - Shipyard: Howaldtswerke, Kiel
- Commander
- Fate: Construction suspended on September 30, 1943, and cancelled on July 22, 1944.
- U-boat.net webpage for U-696

== U-697 ==
- Type: VIIC/41
- Construction
  - Laid Down:
  - Launched:
  - Commissioned:
  - Shipyard: Howaldtswerke, Kiel
- Commander
- Fate: Construction suspended on September 30, 1943, and cancelled on July 22, 1944.
- U-boat.net webpage for U-697

== U-698 ==
- Type: VIIC/41
- Construction
  - Laid Down:
  - Launched:
  - Commissioned:
  - Shipyard: Howaldtswerke, Kiel
- Commander
- Fate: Construction suspended on September 30, 1943, and cancelled on July 22, 1944.
- U-boat.net webpage for U-698

== U-699 ==
- Type: VIIC/42
- Construction
  - Laid Down:
  - Launched:
  - Commissioned:
  - Shipyard: Howaldtswerke, Kiel
- Commander
- Fate: Cancelled on November 6, 1943.
- U-boat.net webpage for U-699

== U-700 ==
- Type: VIIC/42
- Construction
  - Laid Down:
  - Launched:
  - Commissioned:
  - Shipyard: Howaldtswerke, Kiel
- Commander
- Fate: Cancelled on November 6, 1943.
- U-boat.net webpage for U-700

== U-723 ==
- Type: VIIC/41
- Construction
  - Laid Down: June 9, 1943
  - Launched:
  - Commissioned:
  - Shipyard: Stülcken-Werft, Hamburg
- Commander
- Fate: Construction postponed on September 30, 1943, and never built.
- U-boat.net webpage for U-723

== U-724 ==
- Type: VIIC/41
- Construction
  - Laid Down: July 25, 1943
  - Launched:
  - Commissioned:
  - Shipyard: Stülcken-Werft, Hamburg
- Commander
- Fate: Construction postponed on September 30, 1943, and never built.
- U-boat.net webpage for U-724

== U-725 ==
- Type: VIIC/41
- Construction
  - Laid Down:
  - Launched:
  - Commissioned:
  - Shipyard: Stülcken-Werft, Hamburg
- Commander
- Fate: Construction postponed on September 30, 1943, and cancelled July 22, 1944.
- U-boat.net webpage for U-725

== U-726 ==
- Type: VIIC/41
- Construction
  - Laid Down:
  - Launched:
  - Commissioned:
  - Shipyard: Stülcken-Werft, Hamburg
- Commander
- Fate: Construction postponed on September 30, 1943, and cancelled July 22, 1944.
- U-boat.net webpage for U-726

== U-727 ==
- Type: VIIC/41
- Construction
  - Laid Down:
  - Launched:
  - Commissioned:
  - Shipyard: Stülcken-Werft, Hamburg
- Commander
- Fate: Construction postponed on September 30, 1943, and cancelled July 22, 1944.
- U-boat.net webpage for U-727

== U-728 ==
- Type: VIIC/41
- Construction
  - Laid Down:
  - Launched:
  - Commissioned:
  - Shipyard: Stülcken-Werft, Hamburg
- Commander
- Fate: Construction postponed on September 30, 1943, and cancelled July 22, 1944.
- U-boat.net webpage for U-728

== U-729 ==
- Type: VIIC/41
- Construction
  - Laid Down:
  - Launched:
  - Commissioned:
  - Shipyard: Stülcken-Werft, Hamburg
- Commander
- Fate: Construction postponed on September 30, 1943, and cancelled July 22, 1944.
- U-boat.net webpage for U-729

== U-730 ==
- Type: VIIC/41
- Construction
  - Laid Down:
  - Launched:
  - Commissioned:
  - Shipyard: Stülcken-Werft, Hamburg
- Commander
- Fate: Construction postponed on September 30, 1943, and cancelled July 22, 1944.
- U-boat.net webpage for U-725

== U-769 ==
- Type: VIIC
- Construction
  - Laid Down:
  - Launched:
  - Commissioned:
  - Shipyard: Kriegsmarinewerft, Wilhelmshaven
- Commander
- Fate: Damaged in an air raid (along with U-770) on January 27, 1943. Due to amount of damage the werk number was transferred to another submarine and U-769 was reassigned a new werk number. Construction suspended on September 30, 1943, and cancelled on July 22, 1944.
- U-boat.net webpage for U-769

== U-770 ==
- Type: VIIC
- Construction
  - Laid Down:
  - Launched:
  - Commissioned:
  - Shipyard: Kriegsmarinewerft, Wilhelmshaven
- Commander
- Fate: Damaged in an air raid (along with U-769) on January 27, 1943. Due to amount of damage the werk number was transferred to another submarine and U-770 was reassigned a new werk number. Construction suspended on September 30, 1943, and cancelled on July 22, 1944.
- U-boat.net webpage for U-770

== U-777 ==
- Type: VIIC
- Construction
  - Laid Down: June 5, 1943
  - Launched: March 25, 1944
  - Commissioned: May 9, 1944
  - Shipyard: Kriegsmarinewerft, Wilhelmshaven
- Commander
  - Günter Ruperti
- Fate: Served as a training boat in the 31st Flotilla. Sunk on October 15, 1944, in the Bauhafen at Wilhelmshaven during a British air raid. Raised on October 22, 1944, and decommissioned. Scuttled May 5, 1945 at Wilhelmshaven at the western entrance to the Raederschleuse (lock). Later broken up.
- U-boat.net webpage for U-777

== U-779 ==
- Type: VIIC
- Construction
  - Laid Down: July 21, 1943
  - Launched: June 17, 1944
  - Commissioned: August 24, 1944
  - Shipyard: Kriegsmarinewerft, Wilhelmshaven
- Commander
  - Johann Stegmann
- Fate: Served as a training boat in the 31st Flotilla. Surrendered at Cuxhaven on May 5, 1945. Transferred to Loch Ryan, Scotland from Wilhelmshaven on June 24, 1945. Sunk on December 17, 1945, by gunfire from HMS Onslaught and Cubitt as part of Operation Deadlight.
- U-boat.net webpage for U-779

== U-780 ==
- Type: VIIC
- Construction
  - Laid Down: August 25, 1943
  - Launched:
  - Commissioned:
  - Shipyard: Kriegsmarinewerft, Wilhelmshaven
- Commander
- Fate: Construction suspended on September 30, 1943, and cancelled on July 20, 1944.
- U-boat.net webpage for U-780

== U-781 ==
- Type: VIIC
- Construction
  - Laid Down: September 30, 1943
  - Launched:
  - Commissioned:
  - Shipyard: Kriegsmarinewerft, Wilhelmshaven
- Commander
- Fate: Construction suspended on September 30, 1943, and cancelled on July 20, 1944.
- U-boat.net webpage for U-781

== U-782 ==
- Type: VIIC
- Construction
  - Laid Down: Late 1943
  - Launched:
  - Commissioned:
  - Shipyard: Kriegsmarinewerft, Wilhelmshaven
- Commander
- Fate: Construction suspended on September 30, 1943, and cancelled on July 22, 1944.
- U-boat.net webpage for U-782

== U-783 ==
- Type: VIIC/42
- Construction
  - Laid Down:
  - Launched:
  - Commissioned:
  - Shipyard: Kriegsmarinewerft, Wilhelmshaven
- Commander
- Fate: Construction suspended on September 30, 1943, and cancelled on November 6, 1943.
- U-boat.net webpage for U-783

== U-784 ==
- Type: VIIC/42
- Construction
  - Laid Down:
  - Launched:
  - Commissioned:
  - Shipyard: Kriegsmarinewerft, Wilhelmshaven
- Commander
- Fate: Construction suspended on September 30, 1943, and cancelled on November 6, 1943.
- U-boat.net webpage for U-784

== U-785 ==
- Type: VIIC/42
- Construction
  - Laid Down:
  - Launched:
  - Commissioned:
  - Shipyard: Kriegsmarinewerft, Wilhelmshaven
- Commander
- Fate: Construction suspended on September 30, 1943, and cancelled on November 6, 1943.
- U-boat.net webpage for U-785

== U-786 ==
- Type: VIIC/42
- Construction
  - Laid Down:
  - Launched:
  - Commissioned:
  - Shipyard: Kriegsmarinewerft, Wilhelmshaven
- Commander
- Fate: Construction suspended on September 30, 1943, and cancelled on November 6, 1943.
- U-boat.net webpage for U-786

== U-787 ==
- Type: VIIC/42
- Construction
  - Laid Down:
  - Launched:
  - Commissioned:
  - Shipyard: Kriegsmarinewerft, Wilhelmshaven
- Commander
- Fate: Construction suspended on September 30, 1943, and cancelled on November 6, 1943.
- U-boat.net webpage for U-787

== U-788 ==
- Type: VIIC/42
- Construction
  - Laid Down:
  - Launched:
  - Commissioned:
  - Shipyard: Kriegsmarinewerft, Wilhelmshaven
- Commander
- Fate: Construction suspended on September 30, 1943, and cancelled on November 6, 1943.
- U-boat.net webpage for U-788

== U-789 ==
- Type: VIIC/42
- Construction
  - Laid Down:
  - Launched:
  - Commissioned:
  - Shipyard: Kriegsmarinewerft, Wilhelmshaven
- Commander
- Fate: Construction suspended on September 30, 1943, and cancelled on November 6, 1943.
- U-boat.net webpage for U-789

== U-790 ==
- Type: VIIC/42
- Construction
  - Laid Down:
  - Launched:
  - Commissioned:
  - Shipyard: Kriegsmarinewerft, Wilhelmshaven
- Commander
- Fate: Construction suspended on September 30, 1943, and cancelled on November 6, 1943.
- U-boat.net webpage for U-784

== U-791 ==
- Type: V 300
- Construction
  - Laid Down:
  - Launched:
  - Commissioned:
  - Shipyard: Germaniawerft, Kiel
- Commander
- Fate: Enlarged version of V 80, except with a conning tower. The only ship of this type; cancelled on August 7, 1942, in favor of other more promising Walter designs.
- U-boat.net webpage for U-791

== U-792 ==
- Type: XVIIA
- Construction
  - Laid Down: December 1, 1942
  - Launched: September 28, 1943
  - Commissioned: November 16, 1943
  - Shipyard: Blohm & Voss, Hamburg
- Commander
  - Horst Heitz
  - Hans Diederich Huis
- Fate: Used for trials and later as a floating fuel bunker. Scuttled in the Audorfer See near Rendsburg on May 4, 1945. Raised on May 26, 1945, and taken to Britain as a war prize and used for trials, but was soon torn down for parts and scrapped. Final fate unknown.
- U-boat.net webpage for U-792

== U-793 ==
- Type: XVIIA
- Construction
  - Laid Down: December 1, 1942
  - Launched: September 28, 1943
  - Commissioned: November 16, 1943
  - Shipyard: Blohm & Voss, Hamburg
- Commander
  - Gunter Schauenburg
  - Friedrich Schmidt
- Fate: Used for trials; scuttled in the Audorfer See near Rendsburg on May 4, 1945. Raised on May 26, 1945, and taken to Britain as a war prize and used for trials, but was torn down for parts and scrapped.
- U-boat.net webpage for U-793

== U-794 ==
- Type: XVIIA
- Construction
  - Laid Down: February 1, 1943
  - Launched: October 7, 1943
  - Commissioned: November 14, 1943
  - Shipyard: Germaniawerft, Kiel
- Commander
  - Werner Klug
- Fate: Used for trials; scuttled in Gelting Bay on May 5, 1945. Later raised and broken up.
- U-boat.net webpage for U-794

== U-795 ==
- Type: XVIIA
- Construction
  - Laid Down: February 2, 1943
  - Launched: March 21, 1944
  - Commissioned: April 22, 1944
  - Shipyard: Germaniawerft, Kiel
- Commander
  - Horst Selle
- Fate: Used for trials. Decommissioned February 22, 1945. Scuttled at Germaniawerft on May 3, 1945. Later broken up.
- U-boat.net webpage for U-794

== U-796 ==
- Type: XVIII
- Construction
  - Laid Down: December 27, 1943
  - Launched:
  - Commissioned:
  - Shipyard: Germaniawerft, Kiel
- Commander
- Fate: Construction cancelled on March 27, 1944.
- U-boat.net webpage for U-796

== U-797 ==
- Type: XVIII
- Construction
  - Laid Down:
  - Launched:
  - Commissioned:
  - Shipyard: Germaniawerft, Kiel
- Commander
- Fate: Construction cancelled on March 27, 1944. Was never laid down.
- U-boat.net webpage for U-797

== U-798 ==
- Type: XVIIK
- Construction
  - Laid Down: April 23, 1944
  - Launched:
  - Commissioned:
  - Shipyard: Germaniawerft, Kiel
- Commander
- Fate: Was still incomplete in May 1945.
- U-boat.net webpage for U-798

== U-803 ==
- Type: IXC/40
- Construction
  - Laid Down: June 30, 1942
  - Launched: April 1, 1943
  - Commissioned: September 7, 1943
  - Shipyard: Seebeckwerft, Bremen
- Commander
  - Karl Schimpf
- Fate: Served as a training boat in the 4th Flotilla. Sunk in the Baltic Sea off Swinemünde on April 27, 1944, in the 'Geranium' minefield by a British air-dropped mine.
- U-boat.net webpage for U-803

== U-807 ==
- Type: IXC/40
- Construction
  - Laid Down: 1943
  - Launched:
  - Commissioned:
  - Shipyard: Seebeckwerft, Bremen
- Commander
- Fate: Construction suspended on September 30, 1943, and cancelled on July 22, 1944.
- U-boat.net webpage for U-807

== U-808 ==
- Type: IXC/40
- Construction
  - Laid Down: 1943
  - Launched:
  - Commissioned:
  - Shipyard: Seebeckwerft, Bremen
- Commander
- Fate: Construction suspended on September 30, 1943, and cancelled on July 22, 1944.
- U-boat.net webpage for U-808

== U-809 ==
- Type: IXC/40
- Construction
  - Laid Down:
  - Launched:
  - Commissioned:
  - Shipyard: Seebeckwerft, Bremen
- Commander
- Fate: Construction suspended on September 30, 1943, and cancelled on July 22, 1944.
- U-boat.net webpage for U-809

== U-810 ==
- Type: IXC/40
- Construction
  - Laid Down:
  - Launched:
  - Commissioned:
  - Shipyard: Seebeckwerft, Bremen
- Commander
- Fate: Construction suspended on September 30, 1943, and cancelled on July 22, 1944.
- U-boat.net webpage for U-810

== U-811 ==
- Type: IXC/40
- Construction
  - Laid Down:
  - Launched:
  - Commissioned:
  - Shipyard: Seebeckwerft, Bremen
- Commander
- Fate: Construction suspended on September 30, 1943, and cancelled on July 22, 1944.
- U-boat.net webpage for U-811

== U-812 ==
- Type: IXC/40
- Construction
  - Laid Down:
  - Launched:
  - Commissioned:
  - Shipyard: Seebeckwerft, Bremen
- Commander
- Fate: Construction suspended on September 30, 1943, and cancelled on July 22, 1944.
- U-boat.net webpage for U-812

== U-813 ==
- Type: IXC/40
- Construction
  - Laid Down:
  - Launched:
  - Commissioned:
  - Shipyard: Seebeckwerft, Bremen
- Commander
- Fate: Construction suspended on September 30, 1943, and cancelled on November 6, 1943.
- U-boat.net webpage for U-813

== U-814 ==
- Type: IXC/40
- Construction
  - Laid Down:
  - Launched:
  - Commissioned:
  - Shipyard: Seebeckwerft, Bremen
- Commander
- Fate: Construction suspended on September 30, 1943, and cancelled on November 6, 1943.
- U-boat.net webpage for U-814

== U-815 ==
- Type: IXC/40
- Construction
  - Laid Down:
  - Launched:
  - Commissioned:
  - Shipyard: Seebeckwerft, Bremen
- Commander
- Fate: Construction suspended on September 30, 1943, and cancelled on November 6, 1943.
- U-boat.net webpage for U-815

== U-816 ==
- Type: IXC/40
- Construction
  - Laid Down:
  - Launched:
  - Commissioned:
  - Shipyard: Seebeckwerft, Bremen
- Commander
- Fate: Construction suspended on September 30, 1943, and cancelled on November 6, 1943.
- U-boat.net webpage for U-816

== U-822 ==
- Type: VIIC
- Construction
  - Laid Down: October 29, 1941
  - Launched: February 20, 1944
  - Commissioned: July 1, 1944
  - Shipyard: Oderwerke, Stettin
- Commander
  - Josef Elsinghorst
- Fate: Served as a training boat in the 4th Flotilla. Scuttled at Wesermünde on May 5, 1945, as part of Operation Regenbogen. Raised and broken up in 1948.
- U-boat.net webpage for U-822

== U-823 ==
- Type: VIIC
- Construction
  - Laid Down: November 11, 1941
  - Launched:
  - Commissioned:
  - Shipyard: Oderwerke, Stettin
- Commander
- Fate: Construction suspended on November 6, 1943. Cancelled on July 20, 1944, and left unfinished.
- U-boat.net webpage for U-823

== U-824 ==
- Type: VIIC
- Construction
  - Laid Down: November 24, 1941
  - Launched:
  - Commissioned:
  - Shipyard: Oderwerke, Stettin
- Commander
- Fate: Construction suspended on November 6, 1943. Cancelled on July 20, 1944, and left unfinished.
- U-boat.net webpage for U-824

== U-828 ==
- Type: VIIC/41
- Construction
  - Laid Down: August 16, 1943
  - Launched: March 16, 1944
  - Commissioned: June 17, 1944
  - Shipyard: Schichau-Werke, Danzig
- Commander
  - Alfred John
- Fate: Served as a training boat in the 8th Flotilla and then the 5th Flotilla. Scuttled at Wesermünde on May 5, 1945. Broken up in 1948.
- U-boat.net webpage for U-828

== U-829 ==
- Type: VIIC/41
- Construction
  - Laid Down:
  - Launched:
  - Commissioned:
  - Shipyard: Schichau-Werke, Danzig
- Commander
- Fate: Construction suspended on September 30, 1943, and cancelled on July 22, 1944.
- U-boat.net webpage for U-829

== U-840 ==
- Type: VIIC/41
- Construction
  - Laid Down:
  - Launched:
  - Commissioned:
  - Shipyard: Schichau-Werke, Danzig
- Commander
- Fate: Construction suspended on September 30, 1943, and cancelled on July 22, 1944.
- U-boat.net webpage for U-840

== U-876 ==
- Type: IXD2
- Construction
  - Laid Down: June 5, 1943
  - Launched: February 29, 1944
  - Commissioned: May 24, 1944
  - Shipyard: AG Weser, Bremen
- Commander
  - Rolf Bahn
- Fate: Served as a training boat in the 4th Flotilla. Damaged by British bombs on April 9, 1945. Scuttled at Eckernförde on May 3, 1945. Broken up in 1947.
- U-boat.net webpage for U-876

== U-882 ==
- Type: IXC/40
- Construction
  - Laid Down: August 21, 1943
  - Launched: April 29, 1944
  - Commissioned:
  - Shipyard: AG Weser, Bremen
- Commander
- Fate: Bombed in dock on March 30, 1945.
- U-boat.net webpage for U-882

== U-883 ==
- Type: IXD/42
- Construction
  - Laid Down: July 27, 1943
  - Launched: April 28, 1944
  - Commissioned: March 27, 1945
  - Shipyard: AG Weser, Bremen
- Commander
  - Johannes Uebel
- Fate: Surrendered at Cuxhaven on May 5, 1945. Transferred to Lisahally, Northern Ireland from Wilhelmshaven on June 21, 1945, for Operation Deadlight and sunk on December 31, 1945. U-883 was the only commissioned Type IXD/42 submarine.
- U-boat.net webpage for U-883

== U-884 ==
- Type: IXD/42
- Construction
  - Laid Down: August 29, 1943
  - Launched: May 17, 1944
  - Commissioned:
  - Shipyard: AG Weser, Bremen
- Commander
- Fate: Badly damaged by an American bombing raid on March 30, 1945.
- U-boat.net webpage for U-884

== U-885 ==
- Type: IXD/42
- Construction
  - Laid Down:
  - Launched:
  - Commissioned:
  - Shipyard: AG Weser, Bremen
- Commander
- Fate: Construction suspended November 6, 1943 and cancelled July 22, 1944. Was not laid down.
- U-boat.net webpage for U-885

== U-886 ==
- Type: IXD/42
- Construction
  - Laid Down:
  - Launched:
  - Commissioned:
  - Shipyard: AG Weser, Bremen
- Commander
- Fate: Construction suspended November 6, 1943 and cancelled July 22, 1944. Was not laid down.
- U-boat.net webpage for U-886

== U-887 ==
- Type: IXD/42
- Construction
  - Laid Down:
  - Launched:
  - Commissioned:
  - Shipyard: AG Weser, Bremen
- Commander
- Fate: Construction suspended November 6, 1943 and cancelled July 22, 1944. Was not laid down.
- U-boat.net webpage for U-887

== U-888 ==
- Type: IXD/42
- Construction
  - Laid Down:
  - Launched:
  - Commissioned:
  - Shipyard: AG Weser, Bremen
- Commander
- Fate: Construction suspended November 6, 1943 and cancelled July 22, 1944. Was not laid down.
- U-boat.net webpage for U-888

== U-890 ==
- Type: IXC/40
- Construction
  - Laid Down: September 20, 1943
  - Launched: April 24, 1944
  - Commissioned:
  - Shipyard: AG Weser, Bremen
- Commander
- Fate: Sunk on July 29, 1944, while being fitted out.
- U-boat.net webpage for U-890

== U-891 ==
- Type: IXC/40
- Construction
  - Laid Down: October 11, 1943
  - Launched: May 4, 1944
  - Commissioned:
  - Shipyard: AG Weser, Bremen
- Commander
- Fate: Sunk during an air raid on March 30, 1945, while being fitted out.
- U-boat.net webpage for U-891

== U-892 ==
- Type: IXC/40
- Construction
  - Laid Down: October 23, 1943
  - Launched:
  - Commissioned:
  - Shipyard: AG Weser, Bremen
- Commander
- Fate: Construction suspended on September 23, 1944.
- U-boat.net webpage for U-892

== U-893 ==
- Type: IXC/40
- Construction
  - Laid Down:
  - Launched:
  - Commissioned:
  - Shipyard: AG Weser, Bremen
- Commander
- Fate: Construction suspended on November 6, 1943, and cancelled on July 22, 1944.
- U-boat.net webpage for U-893

== U-894 ==
- Type: IXC/40
- Construction
  - Laid Down:
  - Launched:
  - Commissioned:
  - Shipyard: AG Weser, Bremen
- Commander
- Fate: Construction suspended on November 6, 1943, and cancelled on July 22, 1944.
- U-boat.net webpage for U-894

== U-895 ==
- Type: IXC/40
- Construction
  - Laid Down:
  - Launched:
  - Commissioned:
  - Shipyard: AG Weser, Bremen
- Commander
- Fate: Construction suspended on September 30, 1943, and cancelled on July 22, 1944.
- U-boat.net webpage for U-895

== U-896 ==
- Type: IXC/40
- Construction
  - Laid Down:
  - Launched:
  - Commissioned:
  - Shipyard: AG Weser, Bremen
- Commander
- Fate: Construction suspended on September 30, 1943, and cancelled on July 22, 1944.
- U-boat.net webpage for U-896

== U-897 ==
- Type: IXC/40
- Construction
  - Laid Down:
  - Launched:
  - Commissioned:
  - Shipyard: AG Weser, Bremen
- Commander
- Fate: Construction suspended on September 30, 1943, and cancelled on July 22, 1944.
- U-boat.net webpage for U-897

== U-898 ==
- Type: IXC/40
- Construction
  - Laid Down:
  - Launched:
  - Commissioned:
  - Shipyard: AG Weser, Bremen
- Commander
- Fate: Construction suspended on November 6, 1943, and cancelled on July 22, 1944.
- U-boat.net webpage for U-898

== U-899 ==
- Type: IXC/40
- Construction
  - Laid Down:
  - Launched:
  - Commissioned:
  - Shipyard: AG Weser, Bremen
- Commander
- Fate: Construction suspended on September 30, 1943, and cancelled on July 22, 1944.
- U-boat.net webpage for U-899

== U-900 ==
- Type: IXD/42
- Construction
  - Laid Down:
  - Launched:
  - Commissioned:
  - Shipyard: AG Weser, Bremen
- Commander
- Fate: Construction suspended on September 30, 1943, and cancelled on November 6, 1943. Keel had not been laid down.
- U-boat.net webpage for U-900

== U-902 ==
- Type: VIIC
- Construction
  - Laid Down: January 24, 1942
  - Launched: December 24, 1943
  - Commissioned:
  - Shipyard: Vulcan, Stettin
- Commander
- Fate: Damaged twice by bombs, cancelled on July 22, 1944.
- U-boat.net webpage for U-902

== U-903 ==
- Type: VIIC
- Construction
  - Laid Down: August 25, 1942
  - Launched: July 17, 1943
  - Commissioned: September 4, 1943
  - Shipyard: Flender Werke, Lübeck
- Commander
  - Hans Hellmann
  - Otto Fränzel
  - Otto Tinschert
- Fate: Served as a training boat in the 23rd Flotilla and then the 31st Flotilla. Scuttled on May 5, 1945, in Gelting Bay. Broken up in 1947.
- U-boat.net webpage for U-903

== U-904 ==
- Type: VIIC
- Construction
  - Laid Down: September 10, 1942
  - Launched: August 7, 1943
  - Commissioned: September 25, 1943
  - Shipyard: Flender Werke, Lübeck
- Commander
  - Detlev Fritz
  - Dieter Erdmann
  - Günter Stührmann
- Fate: Served as a training boat in the 23rd Flotilla and then the 3rd Flotilla. Scuttled on May 4, 1945, in the U-boat base at Eckernförde.
- U-boat.net webpage for U-903

== U-906 ==
- Type: VIIC
- Construction
  - Laid Down: February 27, 1943
  - Launched: April 1, 1944
  - Commissioned:
  - Shipyard: Stülcken-Werft, Hamburg
- Commander
- Fate: Sunk during an air raid on December 31, 1944, and left unfinished.
- U-boat.net webpage for U-906

== U-908 ==
- Type: VIIC
- Construction
  - Laid Down: May 3, 1943
  - Launched:
  - Commissioned:
  - Shipyard: Stülcken-Werft, Hamburg
- Commander
- Fate: Damaged by bombs and left unfinished.
- U-boat.net webpage for U-908

== U-909 ==
- Type: VIIC/41
- Construction
  - Laid Down:
  - Launched:
  - Commissioned:
  - Shipyard: Stülcken-Werft, Hamburg
- Commander
- Fate: Construction suspended on September 30, 1943, and cancelled July 22, 1944.
- U-boat.net webpage for U-909

== U-910 ==
- Type: VIIC/41
- Construction
  - Laid Down:
  - Launched:
  - Commissioned:
  - Shipyard: Stülcken-Werft, Hamburg
- Commander
- Fate: Construction suspended on September 30, 1943, and cancelled July 22, 1944.
- U-boat.net webpage for U-910

== U-911 ==
- Type: VIIC/41
- Construction
  - Laid Down:
  - Launched:
  - Commissioned:
  - Shipyard: Stülcken-Werft, Hamburg
- Commander
- Fate: Construction suspended on September 30, 1943, and cancelled July 22, 1944.
- U-boat.net webpage for U-911

== U-912 ==
- Type: VIIC/41
- Construction
  - Laid Down:
  - Launched:
  - Commissioned:
  - Shipyard: Stülcken-Werft, Hamburg
- Commander
- Fate: Construction suspended on September 30, 1943, and cancelled July 22, 1944.
- U-boat.net webpage for U-912

== U-913 ==
- Type: VIIC/42
- Construction
  - Laid Down:
  - Launched:
  - Commissioned:
  - Shipyard: Stülcken-Werft, Hamburg
- Commander
- Fate: Construction suspended on September 30, 1943, and cancelled November 6, 1943.
- U-boat.net webpage for U-913

== U-914 ==
- Type: VIIC/42
- Construction
  - Laid Down:
  - Launched:
  - Commissioned:
  - Shipyard: Stülcken-Werft, Hamburg
- Commander
- Fate: Construction suspended on September 30, 1943, and cancelled November 6, 1943.
- U-boat.net webpage for U-914

== U-915 ==
- Type: VIIC/42
- Construction
  - Laid Down:
  - Launched:
  - Commissioned:
  - Shipyard: Stülcken-Werft, Hamburg
- Commander
- Fate: Construction suspended on September 30, 1943, and cancelled November 6, 1943.
- U-boat.net webpage for U-915

== U-916 ==
- Type: VIIC/42
- Construction
  - Laid Down:
  - Launched:
  - Commissioned:
  - Shipyard: Stülcken-Werft, Hamburg
- Commander
- Fate: Construction suspended on September 30, 1943, and cancelled November 6, 1943.
- U-boat.net webpage for U-916

== U-917 ==
- Type: VIIC/42
- Construction
  - Laid Down:
  - Launched:
  - Commissioned:
  - Shipyard: Stülcken-Werft, Hamburg
- Commander
- Fate: Construction suspended on September 30, 1943, and cancelled November 6, 1943.
- U-boat.net webpage for U-917

== U-918 ==
- Type: VIIC/42
- Construction
  - Laid Down:
  - Launched:
  - Commissioned:
  - Shipyard: Stülcken-Werft, Hamburg
- Commander
- Fate: Construction suspended on September 30, 1943, and cancelled November 6, 1943.
- U-boat.net webpage for U-918

== U-922 ==
- Type: VIIC
- Construction
  - Laid Down: December 15, 1941
  - Launched: June 1, 1943
  - Commissioned: August 1, 1943
  - Shipyard: Neptun-Werft AG, Rostock
- Commander
  - Ulrich-Philipp Graf von und zu Arco-Zinneberg
  - Eduard Aust
  - Erich Käselau
- Fate: Served as a training boat in the 21st, 23rd and 31st flotillas. Scuttled on May 3, 1945, at Kiel. Broken up in 1947.
- U-boat.net webpage for U-922

== U-931 ==
- Type: VIIC/41
- Construction
  - Laid Down: June 26, 1943
  - Launched:
  - Commissioned:
  - Shipyard: Neptun-Werft AG, Rostock
- Commander
- Fate: Was 40% complete when it was cancelled on September 23, 1944, and broken up.
- U-boat.net webpage for U-931

== U-932 ==
- Type: VIIC/41
- Construction
  - Laid Down: August 21, 1943
  - Launched:
  - Commissioned:
  - Shipyard: Neptun-Werft AG, Rostock
- Commander
- Fate: Was 35% complete when it was cancelled on September 23, 1944, and broken up.
- U-boat.net webpage for U-932

== U-933 ==
- Type: VIIC/41
- Construction
  - Laid Down:
  - Launched:
  - Commissioned:
  - Shipyard: Neptun-Werft AG, Rostock
- Commander
- Fate: Construction suspended on September 30, 1943, and cancelled July 22, 1944.
- U-boat.net webpage for U-933

== U-934 ==
- Type: VIIC/41
- Construction
  - Laid Down:
  - Launched:
  - Commissioned:
  - Shipyard: Neptun-Werft AG, Rostock
- Commander
- Fate: Construction suspended on September 30, 1943, and cancelled July 22, 1944.
- U-boat.net webpage for U-934

== U-935 ==
- Type: VIIC/41
- Construction
  - Laid Down:
  - Launched:
  - Commissioned:
  - Shipyard: Neptun-Werft AG, Rostock
- Commander
- Fate: Construction suspended on September 30, 1943, and cancelled July 22, 1944.
- U-boat.net webpage for U-935

== U-936 ==
- Type: VIIC/41
- Construction
  - Laid Down:
  - Launched:
  - Commissioned:
  - Shipyard: Neptun-Werft AG, Rostock
- Commander
- Fate: Construction suspended on September 30, 1943, and cancelled July 22, 1944.
- U-boat.net webpage for U-936

== U-937 ==
- Type: VIIC/42
- Construction
  - Laid Down:
  - Launched:
  - Commissioned:
  - Shipyard: Neptun-Werft AG, Rostock
- Commander
- Fate: Construction suspended on September 30, 1943, and cancelled November 6, 1943.
- U-boat.net webpage for U-937

== U-938 ==
- Type: VIIC/42
- Construction
  - Laid Down:
  - Launched:
  - Commissioned:
  - Shipyard: Neptun-Werft AG, Rostock
- Commander
- Fate: Construction suspended on September 30, 1943, and cancelled November 6, 1943.
- U-boat.net webpage for U-937

== U-939 ==
- Type: VIIC/42
- Construction
  - Laid Down:
  - Launched:
  - Commissioned:
  - Shipyard: Neptun-Werft AG, Rostock
- Commander
- Fate: Construction suspended on September 30, 1943, and cancelled November 6, 1943.
- U-boat.net webpage for U-939

== U-940 ==
- Type: VIIC/42
- Construction
  - Laid Down:
  - Launched:
  - Commissioned:
  - Shipyard: Neptun-Werft AG, Rostock
- Commander
- Fate: Construction suspended on September 30, 1943, and cancelled November 6, 1943.
- U-boat.net webpage for U-940

== U-941 ==
- Type: VIIC/42
- Construction
  - Laid Down:
  - Launched:
  - Commissioned:
  - Shipyard: Neptun-Werft AG, Rostock
- Commander
- Fate: Construction suspended on September 30, 1943, and cancelled November 6, 1943.
- U-boat.net webpage for U-941

== U-942 ==
- Type: VIIC/42
- Construction
  - Laid Down:
  - Launched:
  - Commissioned:
  - Shipyard: Neptun-Werft AG, Rostock
- Commander
- Fate: Construction suspended on September 30, 1943, and cancelled November 6, 1943.
- U-boat.net webpage for U-942

== U-983 ==
- Type: VIIC
- Construction
  - Laid Down: September 7, 1942
  - Launched: May 12, 1943
  - Commissioned: June 16, 1943
  - Shipyard: Blohm & Voss, Hamburg
- Commander
  - Hans Reimers
- Fate: Served as a training boat in the 5th Flotilla. Sunk on September 8, 1943, in the Baltic Sea north of Leba following a collision with German submarine U-988.
- U-boat.net webpage for U-983

== U-996 ==
- Type: VIIC/41
- Construction
  - Laid Down: November 25, 1942
  - Launched: July 22, 1943
  - Commissioned:
  - Shipyard: Blohm & Voss, Hamburg
- Commander
- Fate: Sunk at dock in August 1944.
- U-boat.net webpage for U-996

== U-1011 ==
- Type: VIIC/41
- Construction
  - Laid Down: March 12, 1943
  - Launched:
  - Commissioned:
  - Shipyard: Blohm & Voss, Hamburg
- Commander
- Fate: Damaged during an RAF raid on July 25, 1943; repair work cancelled on July 22, 1944.
- U-boat.net webpage for U-1011

== U-1012 ==
- Type: VIIC/41
- Construction
  - Laid Down: March 11, 1943
  - Launched:
  - Commissioned:
  - Shipyard: Blohm & Voss, Hamburg
- Commander
- Fate: Damaged during an RAF raid on July 25, 1943; repair work cancelled on July 22, 1944.
- U-boat.net webpage for U-1012

== U-1026 ==
- Type: VIIC/41
- Construction
  - Laid Down: June 3, 1943
  - Launched: May 25, 1944
  - Commissioned:
  - Shipyard: Blohm & Voss, Hamburg
- Commander
- Fate: Never finished, scuttled in May 1945.
- U-boat.net webpage for U-1026

== U-1027 ==
- Type: VIIC/41
- Construction
  - Laid Down: June 17, 1943
  - Launched: November 27, 1944
  - Commissioned:
  - Shipyard: Blohm & Voss, Hamburg
- Commander
- Fate: Never finished, scuttled in May 1945.
- U-boat.net webpage for U-1027

== U-1028 ==
- Type: VIIC/41
- Construction
  - Laid Down: June 17, 1943
  - Launched: November 28, 1944
  - Commissioned:
  - Shipyard: Blohm & Voss, Hamburg
- Commander
- Fate: Never finished, scuttled in May 1945.
- U-boat.net webpage for U-1028

== U-1029 ==
- Type: VIIC/41
- Construction
  - Laid Down: June 18, 1943
  - Launched: July 5, 1944
  - Commissioned:
  - Shipyard: Blohm & Voss, Hamburg
- Commander
- Fate: Never finished, scuttled in May 1945.
- U-boat.net webpage for U-1029

== U-1030 ==
- Type: VIIC/41
- Construction
  - Laid Down: June 28, 1943
  - Launched: July 5, 1944
  - Commissioned:
  - Shipyard: Blohm & Voss, Hamburg
- Commander
- Fate: Never finished, scuttled in May 1945.
- U-boat.net webpage for U-1030

== U-1031 ==
- Type: VIIC/41
- Construction
  - Laid Down: July 12, 1943
  - Launched:
  - Commissioned:
  - Shipyard: Blohm & Voss, Hamburg
- Commander
- Fate: Construction suspended on September 30, 1943. Cancelled on July 22, 1944, and broken up.
- U-boat.net webpage for U-1031

== U-1032 ==
- Type: VIIC/41
- Construction
  - Laid Down: July 12, 1943
  - Launched:
  - Commissioned:
  - Shipyard: Blohm & Voss, Hamburg
- Commander
- Fate: Construction suspended on September 30, 1943. Cancelled on July 22, 1944, and broken up.
- U-boat.net webpage for U-1032

== U-1033 ==
- Type: VIIC/41
- Construction
  - Laid Down:
  - Launched:
  - Commissioned:
  - Shipyard: Blohm & Voss, Hamburg
- Commander
- Fate: Construction suspended on September 30, 1943, and cancelled on July 22, 1944.
- U-boat.net webpage for U-1033

== U-1050 ==
- Type: VIIC/41
- Construction
  - Laid Down:
  - Launched:
  - Commissioned:
  - Shipyard: Blohm & Voss, Hamburg
- Commander
- Fate: Construction suspended on September 30, 1943, and cancelled on July 22, 1944.
- U-boat.net webpage for U-1050

== U-1066 ==
- Type: VIIC/41
- Construction
  - Laid Down:
  - Launched:
  - Commissioned:
  - Shipyard: Blohm & Voss, Hamburg
- Commander
- Fate: Construction suspended on September 30, 1943, and cancelled on July 22, 1944.
- U-boat.net webpage for U-1066

== U-1067 ==
- Type: VIIC/41
- Construction
  - Laid Down:
  - Launched:
  - Commissioned:
  - Shipyard: Blohm & Voss, Hamburg
- Commander
- Fate: Construction suspended on September 30, 1943, and cancelled on July 22, 1944.
- U-boat.net webpage for U-1067

== U-1068 ==
- Type: VIIC/41
- Construction
  - Laid Down:
  - Launched:
  - Commissioned:
  - Shipyard: Blohm & Voss, Hamburg
- Commander
- Fate: Construction suspended on September 30, 1943, and cancelled on July 22, 1944.
- U-boat.net webpage for U-1068

== U-1069 ==
- Type: VIIC/42
- Construction
  - Laid Down:
  - Launched:
  - Commissioned:
  - Shipyard: Germaniawerft, Kiel
- Commander
- Fate: Construction suspended on September 30, 1943. Cancelled in favor of the more promising Type XXI submarine.
- U-boat.net webpage for U-1069

== U-1080 ==
- Type: VIIC/42
- Construction
  - Laid Down:
  - Launched:
  - Commissioned:
  - Shipyard: Germaniawerft, Kiel
- Commander
- Fate: Construction suspended on September 30, 1943. Cancelled in favor of the more promising Type XXI submarine.
- U-boat.net webpage for U-1080

== U-1093 ==
- Type: VIIC/42
- Construction
  - Laid Down:
  - Launched:
  - Commissioned:
  - Shipyard: Germaniawerft, Kiel
- Commander
- Fate: Construction suspended on September 30, 1943.
- U-boat.net webpage for U-1093

== U-1100 ==
- Type: VIIC/42
- Construction
  - Laid Down:
  - Launched:
  - Commissioned:
  - Shipyard: Germaniawerft, Kiel
- Commander
- Fate: Construction suspended on September 30, 1943.
- U-boat.net webpage for U-1069

== U-1108 ==
- Type: VIIC/41
- Construction
  - Laid Down: September 20, 1943
  - Launched: September 5, 1944
  - Commissioned: November 18, 1944
  - Shipyard: Nordseewerken, Emden
- Commander
  - Wolf Wigand
- Fate: Surrendered at Horten, Norway on May 9, 1945. Transferred to Lisahally, Northern Ireland on May 27, 1945. Acquired by Britain and became a British N-class submarine.
- U-boat.net webpage for U-1108

== U-1133 ==
- Type: VIIC/41
- Construction
  - Laid Down: April 27, 1943
  - Launched:
  - Commissioned:
  - Shipyard: Howaldtswerke, Kiel
- Commander
- Fate: Construction suspended on September 30, 1943, and cancelled on July 22, 1944.
- U-boat.net webpage for U-1133

== U-1134 ==
- Type: VIIC/41
- Construction
  - Laid Down: April 30, 1943
  - Launched:
  - Commissioned:
  - Shipyard: Howaldtswerke, Kiel
- Commander
- Fate: Construction suspended on September 30, 1943, and cancelled on July 22, 1944.
- U-boat.net webpage for U-1134

== U-1135 ==
- Type: VIIC/41
- Construction
  - Laid Down: June 24, 1943
  - Launched:
  - Commissioned:
  - Shipyard: Howaldtswerke, Kiel
- Commander
- Fate: Construction suspended on September 30, 1943, and cancelled on July 22, 1944.
- U-boat.net webpage for U-1135

== U-1136 ==
- Type: VIIC/41
- Construction
  - Laid Down: June 24, 1943
  - Launched:
  - Commissioned:
  - Shipyard: Howaldtswerke, Kiel
- Commander
- Fate: Construction suspended on September 30, 1943, and cancelled on July 22, 1944.
- U-boat.net webpage for U-1136

== U-1153 ==
- Type: XXII
- Construction
  - Laid Down:
  - Launched:
  - Commissioned:
  - Shipyard: Howaldtswerke, Kiel
- Commander
- Fate: Cancelled on November 6, 1943.
- U-boat.net webpage for U-1153

== U-1154 ==
- Type: XXII
- Construction
  - Laid Down:
  - Launched:
  - Commissioned:
  - Shipyard: Howaldtswerke, Kiel
- Commander
- Fate: Cancelled on November 6, 1943.
- U-boat.net webpage for U-1154

== U-1171 ==
- Type: VIIC/41
- Construction
  - Laid Down: May 5, 1943
  - Launched: November 23, 1943
  - Commissioned: March 22, 1944
  - Shipyard: Danziger Werft, Danzig
- Commander
  - Otto-Heinrich Nachtigall
  - Hermann Koopmann
- Fate: Surrendered at Stavanger, Norway on May 10, 1945. Transferred to Lisahally, Northern Ireland on May 27, 1945. Acquired by Britain and became British N-class submarine N19.
- U-boat.net webpage for U-1171

== U-1173 ==
- Type: VIIC/41
- Construction
  - Laid Down: May 22, 1943
  - Launched: December 18, 1943
  - Commissioned:
  - Shipyard: Schichau-Werke, Danzig
- Commander
- Fate: Construction stopped on December 18, 1943, and left unfinished.
- U-boat.net webpage for U-1173

== U-1174 ==
- Type: VIIC/41
- Construction
  - Laid Down: June 25, 1943
  - Launched: October 28, 1943
  - Commissioned:
  - Shipyard: Schichau-Werke, Danzig
- Commander
- Fate: Construction stopped on September 23, 1944, after contract was cancelled. Laid up incomplete in Danzig, captured unfinished by the Soviets on March 30, 1945, and launched at Danzig in mid-1945. Towed to Latvia where it was inspected by the TNC at Libau on October 8, 1945, still incomplete. Probably moved to Kronstadt in late 1945 or early 1946 and scrapped in 1947–1948.
- U-boat.net webpage for U-1174

== U-1175 ==
- Type: VIIC/41
- Construction
  - Laid Down: July 2, 1943
  - Launched: October 28, 1943
  - Commissioned:
  - Shipyard: Schichau-Werke, Danzig
- Commander
- Fate: Construction stopped on October 28, 1943, and left unfinished. Cancelled on September 23, 1944.
- U-boat.net webpage for U-1175

== U-1176 ==
- Type: VIIC/41
- Construction
  - Laid Down: July 29, 1943
  - Launched: November 6, 1943
  - Commissioned:
  - Shipyard: Schichau-Werke, Danzig
- Commander
- Fate: Construction stopped on September 23, 1944, after contract was cancelled. Laid up incomplete in Danzig, captured unfinished by the Soviets on March 30, 1945, and launched at Danzig in mid-1945. Towed to Latvia where it was inspected by the TNC at Libau on October 8, 1945, still incomplete and with a jammed rudder. Probably moved to Kronstadt in late 1945 or early 1946 and scrapped in 1947–1948.
- U-boat.net webpage for U-1176

== U-1177 ==
- Type: VIIC/41
- Construction
  - Laid Down: August 7, 1943
  - Launched:
  - Commissioned:
  - Shipyard: Schichau-Werke, Danzig
- Commander
- Fate: Construction suspended on November 6, 1943, but resumed until launching. Construction stopped on July 22, 1944, after contract was cancelled. Laid up incomplete at Kaiser Basin, Danzig, captured unfinished by the Soviets on March 30, 1945, and launched at Danzig in mid-1945. Towed to Latvia where it was inspected by the TNC at Libau on October 8, 1945, still incomplete and with shrapnel damage. Probably moved to Kronstadt in late 1945 or early 1946 and scrapped in 1947–1948.
- U-boat.net webpage for U-1177

== U-1178 ==
- Type: VIIC/41
- Construction
  - Laid Down: September 9, 1943
  - Launched:
  - Commissioned:
  - Shipyard: Schichau-Werke, Danzig
- Commander
- Fate: Construction suspended on November 6, 1943, and cancelled on July 22, 1944.
- U-boat.net webpage for U-1178

== U-1179 ==
- Type: VIIC/41
- Construction
  - Laid Down: September 22, 1943
  - Launched:
  - Commissioned:
  - Shipyard: Schichau-Werke, Danzig
- Commander
- Fate: Construction suspended on November 6, 1943, and cancelled on July 22, 1944.
- U-boat.net webpage for U-1179

== U-1197 ==
- Type: VIIC
- Construction
  - Laid Down: March 13, 1943
  - Launched: September 30, 1943
  - Commissioned: December 2, 1943
  - Shipyard: Schichau-Werke, Danzig
- Commander
  - Heinz Baum
  - Kurt Lau
- Fate: Decommissioned at Wesermünde on April 25, 1945, after suffering severe damage during a US air raid at AG Weser shipyard at Bremen on March 30, 1945. Captured at Wesermünde by British forces in May 1945. Sunk in the North Sea by the US Navy in February 1946.
- U-boat.net webpage for U-1197

== U-1224 ==
- Type: IXC/40
- Construction
  - Laid Down: November 30, 1942
  - Launched: July 7, 1943
  - Commissioned: October 20, 1943
  - Shipyard: Deutsche Werft AG, Hamburg
- Commander
  - Georg Preuss
- Fate: Served as a training boat in the 31st Flotilla. Transferred to Japan as Ro-501 on February 15, 1944. Depth charged and sunk in the mid-Atlantic off the Cape Verde Islands on May 13, 1944, by Francis M. Robinson.
- U-boat.net webpage for U-1224

== U-1236 ==
- Type: IXC/40
- Construction
  - Laid Down: June 7, 1943
  - Launched: February 7, 1944
  - Commissioned:
  - Shipyard: Deutsche Werft AG, Hamburg
- Commander
- Fate: Construction abandoned in 1944 and suspended on September 23, 1944. Scuttled in the Hansa Basin, Hamburg on May 3, 1945. Raised in June or August 1945 and broken up.
- U-boat.net webpage for U-1236

== U-1237 ==
- Type: IXC/40
- Construction
  - Laid Down: June 22, 1943
  - Launched: February 22, 1944
  - Commissioned:
  - Shipyard: Deutsche Werft AG, Hamburg
- Commander
- Fate:
- U-boat.net webpage for U-1237

== U-1238 ==
- Type: IXC/40
- Construction
  - Laid Down: July 6, 1943
  - Launched: March 16, 1944
  - Commissioned:
  - Shipyard: Deutsche Werft AG, Hamburg
- Commander
- Fate:
- U-boat.net webpage for U-1238

== U-1239 ==
- Type: IXC/40
- Construction
  - Laid Down: July 20, 1943
  - Launched:
  - Commissioned:
  - Shipyard: Deutsche Werft AG, Hamburg
- Commander
- Fate:
- U-boat.net webpage for U-1239

== U-1240 ==
- Type: IXC/40
- Construction
  - Laid Down: August 21, 1943
  - Launched:
  - Commissioned:
  - Shipyard: Deutsche Werft AG, Hamburg
- Commander
- Fate:
- U-boat.net webpage for U-1240

== U-1241 ==
- Type: IXC/40
- Construction
  - Laid Down: September 29, 1943
  - Launched:
  - Commissioned:
  - Shipyard: Deutsche Werft AG, Hamburg
- Commander
- Fate:
- U-boat.net webpage for U-1241

== U-1242 ==
- Type: IXC/40
- Construction
  - Laid Down: October 1943
  - Launched:
  - Commissioned:
  - Shipyard: Deutsche Werft AG, Hamburg
- Commander
- Fate:
- U-boat.net webpage for U-1242

== U-1243 ==
- Type: IXC/40
- Construction
  - Laid Down:
  - Launched:
  - Commissioned:
  - Shipyard: Deutsche Werft AG, Hamburg
- Commander
- Fate: Cancelled on September 23, 1943.
- U-boat.net webpage for U-1243

== U-1244 ==
- Type: IXC/40
- Construction
  - Laid Down:
  - Launched:
  - Commissioned:
  - Shipyard: Deutsche Werft AG, Hamburg
- Commander
- Fate: Cancelled on September 23, 1943.
- U-boat.net webpage for U-1244

== U-1245 ==
- Type: IXC/40
- Construction
  - Laid Down:
  - Launched:
  - Commissioned:
  - Shipyard: Deutsche Werft AG, Hamburg
- Commander
- Fate: Construction suspended September 30, 1943 and cancelled July 22, 1944.
- U-boat.net webpage for U-1245

== U-1246 ==
- Type: IXC/40
- Construction
  - Laid Down:
  - Launched:
  - Commissioned:
  - Shipyard: Deutsche Werft AG, Hamburg
- Commander
- Fate: Construction suspended September 30, 1943 and cancelled July 22, 1944.
- U-boat.net webpage for U-1246

== U-1247 ==
- Type: IXC/40
- Construction
  - Laid Down:
  - Launched:
  - Commissioned:
  - Shipyard: Deutsche Werft AG, Hamburg
- Commander
- Fate: Construction suspended September 30, 1943 and cancelled July 22, 1944.
- U-boat.net webpage for U-1247

== U-1248 ==
- Type: IXC/40
- Construction
  - Laid Down:
  - Launched:
  - Commissioned:
  - Shipyard: Deutsche Werft AG, Hamburg
- Commander
- Fate: Construction suspended September 30, 1943 and cancelled July 22, 1944.
- U-boat.net webpage for U-1248

== U-1249 ==
- Type: IXC/40
- Construction
  - Laid Down:
  - Launched:
  - Commissioned:
  - Shipyard: Deutsche Werft AG, Hamburg
- Commander
- Fate: Construction suspended September 30, 1943 and cancelled July 22, 1944.
- U-boat.net webpage for U-1249

== U-1250 ==
- Type: IXC/40
- Construction
  - Laid Down:
  - Launched:
  - Commissioned:
  - Shipyard: Deutsche Werft AG, Hamburg
- Commander
- Fate: Construction suspended September 30, 1943 and cancelled July 22, 1944.
- U-boat.net webpage for U-1250

== U-1251 ==
- Type: IXC/40
- Construction
  - Laid Down:
  - Launched:
  - Commissioned:
  - Shipyard: Deutsche Werft AG, Hamburg
- Commander
- Fate: Construction suspended September 30, 1943 and cancelled November 6, 1943.
- U-boat.net webpage for U-1251

== U-1252 ==
- Type: IXC/40
- Construction
  - Laid Down:
  - Launched:
  - Commissioned:
  - Shipyard: Deutsche Werft AG, Hamburg
- Commander
- Fate: Construction suspended September 30, 1943 and cancelled November 6, 1943.
- U-boat.net webpage for U-1252

== U-1253 ==
- Type: IXC/40
- Construction
  - Laid Down:
  - Launched:
  - Commissioned:
  - Shipyard: Deutsche Werft AG, Hamburg
- Commander
- Fate: Construction suspended September 30, 1943 and cancelled November 6, 1943.
- U-boat.net webpage for U-1253

== U-1254 ==
- Type: IXC/40
- Construction
  - Laid Down:
  - Launched:
  - Commissioned:
  - Shipyard: Deutsche Werft AG, Hamburg
- Commander
- Fate: Construction suspended September 30, 1943 and cancelled November 6, 1943.
- U-boat.net webpage for U-1254

== U-1255 ==
- Type: IXC/40
- Construction
  - Laid Down:
  - Launched:
  - Commissioned:
  - Shipyard: Deutsche Werft AG, Hamburg
- Commander
- Fate: Construction suspended September 30, 1943 and cancelled November 6, 1943.
- U-boat.net webpage for U-1255

== U-1256 ==
- Type: IXC/40
- Construction
  - Laid Down:
  - Launched:
  - Commissioned:
  - Shipyard: Deutsche Werft AG, Hamburg
- Commander
- Fate: Construction suspended September 30, 1943 and cancelled November 6, 1943.
- U-boat.net webpage for U-1256

== U-1257 ==
- Type: IXC/40
- Construction
  - Laid Down:
  - Launched:
  - Commissioned:
  - Shipyard: Deutsche Werft AG, Hamburg
- Commander
- Fate: Construction suspended September 30, 1943 and cancelled November 6, 1943.
- U-boat.net webpage for U-1257

== U-1259 ==
- Type: IXC/40
- Construction
  - Laid Down:
  - Launched:
  - Commissioned:
  - Shipyard: Deutsche Werft AG, Hamburg
- Commander
- Fate: Construction suspended September 30, 1943 and cancelled November 6, 1943.
- U-boat.net webpage for U-1259

== U-1260 ==
- Type: IXC/40
- Construction
  - Laid Down:
  - Launched:
  - Commissioned:
  - Shipyard: Deutsche Werft AG, Hamburg
- Commander
- Fate: Construction suspended September 30, 1943 and cancelled November 6, 1943.
- U-boat.net webpage for U-1260

== U-1261 ==
- Type: IXC/40
- Construction
  - Laid Down:
  - Launched:
  - Commissioned:
  - Shipyard: Deutsche Werft AG, Hamburg
- Commander
- Fate: Construction suspended September 30, 1943 and cancelled November 6, 1943.
- U-boat.net webpage for U-1261

== U-1262 ==
- Type: IXC/40
- Construction
  - Laid Down:
  - Launched:
  - Commissioned:
  - Shipyard: Deutsche Werft AG, Hamburg
- Commander
- Fate: Construction suspended September 30, 1943 and cancelled November 6, 1943.
- U-boat.net webpage for U-1262

== U-1271 ==
- Type: VIIC/41
- Construction
  - Laid Down: April 17, 1943
  - Launched: December 8, 1943
  - Commissioned: January 12, 1944
  - Shipyard: Bremer Vulkan, Bremen-Vegesack
- Commander
  - Erwin Knipping
  - Sven Thienemann
- Fate: Served as a training boat in the 8th Flotilla and then the 33rd Flotilla. Surrendered May 9, 1945 at Bergen, Norway. Transferred to Loch Ryan, Scotland on June 2, 1945. Sunk on December 8, 1945, as part of Operation Deadlight.
- U-boat.net webpage for U-1271

== U-1280 ==
- Type: VIIC/41
- Construction
  - Laid Down: September 17, 1943
  - Launched:
  - Commissioned:
  - Shipyard: Bremer Vulkan, Bremen-Vegesack
- Commander
- Fate: Was 50-60% complete when it was cancelled on September 23, 1944.
- U-boat.net webpage for U-1280

== U-1281 ==
- Type: VIIC/41
- Construction
  - Laid Down: September 17, 1943
  - Launched:
  - Commissioned:
  - Shipyard: Bremer Vulkan, Bremen-Vegesack
- Commander
- Fate: Was 50-60% complete when it was cancelled on September 23, 1944.
- U-boat.net webpage for U-1281

== U-1282 ==
- Type: VIIC/41
- Construction
  - Laid Down: October 20, 1943
  - Launched:
  - Commissioned:
  - Shipyard: Bremer Vulkan, Bremen-Vegesack
- Commander
- Fate: Was 50-60% complete when it was cancelled on September 23, 1944.
- U-boat.net webpage for U-1282

== U-1291 ==
- Type: VIIC/41
- Construction
  - Laid Down:
  - Launched:
  - Commissioned:
  - Shipyard: Bremer Vulkan, Bremen-Vegesack
- Commander
- Fate: Construction suspended on September 30, 1943, and cancelled on November 6, 1943.
- U-boat.net webpage for U-1291

== U-1297 ==
- Type: VIIC/41
- Construction
  - Laid Down:
  - Launched:
  - Commissioned:
  - Shipyard: Bremer Vulkan, Bremen-Vegesack
- Commander
- Fate: Construction suspended on September 30, 1943, and cancelled on November 6, 1943.
- U-boat.net webpage for U-1297

== U-1309 ==
- Type: VIIC/41
- Construction
  - Laid Down:
  - Launched:
  - Commissioned:
  - Shipyard: Flensburger Schiffsbau, Flensburg
- Commander
- Fate: Construction suspended on November 6, 1943, and cancelled on July 22, 1944.
- U-boat.net webpage for U-1309

== U-1339 ==
- Type: VIIC/42
- Construction
  - Laid Down:
  - Launched:
  - Commissioned:
  - Shipyard: Flender Werke, Lübeck
- Commander
- Fate: Cancelled on September 30, 1943.
- U-boat.net webpage for U-1339

== U-1350 ==
- Type: VIIC/42
- Construction
  - Laid Down:
  - Launched:
  - Commissioned:
  - Shipyard: Flender Werke, Lübeck
- Commander
- Fate: Cancelled on September 30, 1943.
- U-boat.net webpage for U-1350

== U-1401 ==
- Type: VIIC/41
- Construction
  - Laid Down:
  - Launched:
  - Commissioned:
  - Shipyard: Blohm & Voss, Hamburg
- Commander
- Fate: Construction suspended on September 30, 1943, and cancelled on July 22, 1944.
- U-boat.net webpage for U-1401

== U-1402 ==
- Type: VIIC/41
- Construction
  - Laid Down:
  - Launched:
  - Commissioned:
  - Shipyard: Blohm & Voss, Hamburg
- Commander
- Fate: Construction suspended on September 30, 1943, and cancelled on July 22, 1944.
- U-boat.net webpage for U-1402

== U-1403 ==
- Type: VIIC/41
- Construction
  - Laid Down:
  - Launched:
  - Commissioned:
  - Shipyard: Blohm & Voss, Hamburg
- Commander
- Fate: Construction suspended on September 30, 1943, and cancelled on July 22, 1944.
- U-boat.net webpage for U-1403

== U-1404 ==
- Type: VIIC/41
- Construction
  - Laid Down:
  - Launched:
  - Commissioned:
  - Shipyard: Blohm & Voss, Hamburg
- Commander
- Fate: Construction suspended on September 30, 1943, and cancelled on July 22, 1944.
- U-boat.net webpage for U-1404

== U-1405 ==
- Type: XVIIB
- Construction
  - Laid Down: October 15, 1943
  - Launched: December 1, 1944
  - Commissioned: December 21, 1944
  - Shipyard: Blohm & Voss, Hamburg
- Commander
  - Wilhelm Rex
- Fate: Served as a training boat in the 8th Flotilla and then the 5th Flotilla. Scuttled on May 5, 1945, in Eckernförde Bay as part of Operation Regenbogen. Later raised and broken up.
- U-boat.net webpage for U-1405

== U-1406 ==
- Type: XVIIB
- Construction
  - Laid Down: October 30, 1943
  - Launched: January 2, 1945
  - Commissioned: February 8, 1945
  - Shipyard: Blohm & Voss, Hamburg
- Commander
  - Werner Klug
- Fate: Only served as a training boat. Surrendered at Cuxhaven, Germany on May 5, 1945. Scuttled along with U-1407 by Oblt. Gerhard Grumpelt against orders on May 7, 1945. Later raised and taken to the US on the deck of transport vessel Shoemaker, arriving at Portsmouth on October 11. Was never repaired or put into service by the US Navy. Sold for scrap in New York in May 1948 to Interstate Metals Corporation and broken up.
- U-boat.net webpage for U-1406

== U-1407 ==
- Type: XVIIB
- Construction
  - Laid Down: November 13, 1943
  - Launched:
  - Commissioned: March 13, 1945
  - Shipyard: Blohm & Voss, Hamburg
- Commander
  - Horst Heitz
- Fate: Surrendered at Cuxhaven, Germany on May 5, 1945. Scuttled along with U-1406 by Gerhard Grumpelt against orders on May 7, 1945. Later raised and taken to Britain as a war prize and became British N-class submarine N25 and later HMS Meteorite.
- U-boat.net webpage for U-1407

== U-1408 ==
- Type: XVIIB
- Construction
  - Laid Down: November 27, 1943
  - Launched:
  - Commissioned:
  - Shipyard: Blohm & Voss, Hamburg
- Commander
- Fate: Damaged in air raid on March 30, 1945, and scuttled at yard before completion.
- U-boat.net webpage for U-1408

== U-1409 ==
- Type: XVIIB
- Construction
  - Laid Down: December 15, 1943
  - Launched:
  - Commissioned:
  - Shipyard: Blohm & Voss, Hamburg
- Commander
- Fate: Damaged in air raid on March 30, 1945, and scuttled at yard before completion.
- U-boat.net webpage for U-1409

== U-1410 ==
- Type: XVIIB
- Construction
  - Laid Down: December 31, 1943
  - Launched:
  - Commissioned:
  - Shipyard: Blohm & Voss, Hamburg
- Commander
- Fate: Damaged in air raid on March 30, 1945, and scuttled at yard before completion.
- U-boat.net webpage for U-1410

== U-1501 ==
- Type: IXC/40
- Construction
  - Laid Down:
  - Launched:
  - Commissioned:
  - Shipyard: AG Weser, Bremen
- Commander
- Fate: Construction suspended September 30, 1943 and cancelled July 22, 1944.
- U-boat.net webpage for U-1501

== U-1502 ==
- Type: IXC/40
- Construction
  - Laid Down:
  - Launched:
  - Commissioned:
  - Shipyard: AG Weser, Bremen
- Commander
- Fate: Construction suspended September 30, 1943 and cancelled July 22, 1944.
- U-boat.net webpage for U-1502

== U-1503 ==
- Type: IXC/40
- Construction
  - Laid Down:
  - Launched:
  - Commissioned:
  - Shipyard: AG Weser, Bremen
- Commander
- Fate: Construction suspended September 30, 1943 and cancelled July 22, 1944.
- U-boat.net webpage for U-1503

== U-1504 ==
- Type: IXC/40
- Construction
  - Laid Down:
  - Launched:
  - Commissioned:
  - Shipyard: AG Weser, Bremen
- Commander
- Fate: Construction suspended September 30, 1943 and cancelled July 22, 1944.
- U-boat.net webpage for U-1504

== U-1505 ==
- Type: IXC/40
- Construction
  - Laid Down:
  - Launched:
  - Commissioned:
  - Shipyard: AG Weser, Bremen
- Commander
- Fate: Construction suspended September 30, 1943 and cancelled July 22, 1944.
- U-boat.net webpage for U-1505

== U-1506 ==
- Type: IXC/40
- Construction
  - Laid Down:
  - Launched:
  - Commissioned:
  - Shipyard: AG Weser, Bremen
- Commander
- Fate: Construction suspended September 30, 1943 and cancelled July 22, 1944.
- U-boat.net webpage for U-1506

== U-1507 ==
- Type: IXC/40
- Construction
  - Laid Down:
  - Launched:
  - Commissioned:
  - Shipyard: AG Weser, Bremen
- Commander
- Fate: Construction cancelled on November 6, 1943.
- U-boat.net webpage for U-1507

== U-1508 ==
- Type: IXC/40
- Construction
  - Laid Down:
  - Launched:
  - Commissioned:
  - Shipyard: AG Weser, Bremen
- Commander
- Fate: Construction cancelled on November 6, 1943.
- U-boat.net webpage for U-1508

== U-1509 ==
- Type: IXC/40
- Construction
  - Laid Down:
  - Launched:
  - Commissioned:
  - Shipyard: AG Weser, Bremen
- Commander
- Fate: Construction cancelled on November 6, 1943.
- U-boat.net webpage for U-1509

== U-1510 ==
- Type: IXC/40
- Construction
  - Laid Down:
  - Launched:
  - Commissioned:
  - Shipyard: AG Weser, Bremen
- Commander
- Fate: Construction cancelled on November 6, 1943.
- U-boat.net webpage for U-1510

== U-1511 ==
- Type: IXC/40
- Construction
  - Laid Down:
  - Launched:
  - Commissioned:
  - Shipyard: AG Weser, Bremen
- Commander
- Fate: Construction cancelled on November 6, 1943.
- U-boat.net webpage for U-1511

== U-1512 ==
- Type: IXC/40
- Construction
  - Laid Down:
  - Launched:
  - Commissioned:
  - Shipyard: AG Weser, Bremen
- Commander
- Fate: Construction cancelled on November 6, 1943.
- U-boat.net webpage for U-1512

== U-1513 ==
- Type: IXC/40
- Construction
  - Laid Down:
  - Launched:
  - Commissioned:
  - Shipyard: AG Weser, Bremen
- Commander
- Fate: Construction cancelled on November 6, 1943.
- U-boat.net webpage for U-1513

== U-1514 ==
- Type: IXC/40
- Construction
  - Laid Down:
  - Launched:
  - Commissioned:
  - Shipyard: AG Weser, Bremen
- Commander
- Fate: Construction cancelled on November 6, 1943.
- U-boat.net webpage for U-1514

== U-1515 ==
- Type: IXC/40
- Construction
  - Laid Down:
  - Launched:
  - Commissioned:
  - Shipyard: AG Weser, Bremen
- Commander
- Fate: Construction cancelled on November 6, 1943.
- U-boat.net webpage for U-1515

== U-1516 ==
- Type: IXC/40
- Construction
  - Laid Down:
  - Launched:
  - Commissioned:
  - Shipyard: AG Weser, Bremen
- Commander
- Fate: Construction cancelled on November 6, 1943.
- U-boat.net webpage for U-1516

== U-1517 ==
- Type: IXC/40
- Construction
  - Laid Down:
  - Launched:
  - Commissioned:
  - Shipyard: AG Weser, Bremen
- Commander
- Fate: Construction cancelled on November 6, 1943.
- U-boat.net webpage for U-1517

== U-1518 ==
- Type: IXC/40
- Construction
  - Laid Down:
  - Launched:
  - Commissioned:
  - Shipyard: AG Weser, Bremen
- Commander
- Fate: Construction cancelled on November 6, 1943.
- U-boat.net webpage for U-1518

== U-1519 ==
- Type: IXC/40
- Construction
  - Laid Down:
  - Launched:
  - Commissioned:
  - Shipyard: AG Weser, Bremen
- Commander
- Fate: Construction cancelled on November 6, 1943.
- U-boat.net webpage for U-1519

== U-1520 ==
- Type: IXC/40
- Construction
  - Laid Down:
  - Launched:
  - Commissioned:
  - Shipyard: AG Weser, Bremen
- Commander
- Fate: Construction cancelled on November 6, 1943.
- U-boat.net webpage for U-1520

== U-1540 ==
- Type: IXC/40
- Construction
  - Laid Down:
  - Launched:
  - Commissioned:
  - Shipyard: AG Weser, Bremen
- Commander
- Fate: Construction cancelled on November 6, 1943.
- U-boat.net webpage for U-1540

== U-1541 ==
- Type: IXC/40
- Construction
  - Laid Down:
  - Launched:
  - Commissioned:
  - Shipyard: AG Weser, Bremen
- Commander
- Fate: Construction cancelled on November 6, 1943.
- U-boat.net webpage for U-1541

== U-1542 ==
- Type: IXC/40
- Construction
  - Laid Down:
  - Launched:
  - Commissioned:
  - Shipyard: AG Weser, Bremen
- Commander
- Fate: Construction cancelled on November 6, 1943.
- U-boat.net webpage for U-1542

== U-1601 ==
- Type: XX
- Construction
  - Laid Down:
  - Launched:
  - Commissioned:
  - Shipyard: Germaniawerft, Kiel
- Commander
- Fate: Construction abandoned on May 27, 1944, before keel was laid down.
- U-boat.net webpage for U-1601

== U-1602 ==
- Type: XX
- Construction
  - Laid Down:
  - Launched:
  - Commissioned:
  - Shipyard: Germaniawerft, Kiel
- Commander
- Fate: Construction abandoned on May 27, 1944, before keel was laid down.
- U-boat.net webpage for U-1602

== U-1603 ==
- Type: XX
- Construction
  - Laid Down:
  - Launched:
  - Commissioned:
  - Shipyard: Germaniawerft, Kiel
- Commander
- Fate: Construction abandoned on May 27, 1944, before keel was laid down.
- U-boat.net webpage for U-1603

== U-1604 ==
- Type: XX
- Construction
  - Laid Down:
  - Launched:
  - Commissioned:
  - Shipyard: Germaniawerft, Kiel
- Commander
- Fate: Construction abandoned on May 27, 1944, before keel was laid down.
- U-boat.net webpage for U-1604

== U-1605 ==
- Type: XX
- Construction
  - Laid Down:
  - Launched:
  - Commissioned:
  - Shipyard: Germaniawerft, Kiel
- Commander
- Fate: Construction abandoned on May 27, 1944, before keel was laid down.
- U-boat.net webpage for U-1605

== U-1606 ==
- Type: XX
- Construction
  - Laid Down:
  - Launched:
  - Commissioned:
  - Shipyard: Germaniawerft, Kiel
- Commander
- Fate: Construction abandoned on May 27, 1944, before keel was laid down.
- U-boat.net webpage for U-1606

== U-1607 ==
- Type: XX
- Construction
  - Laid Down:
  - Launched:
  - Commissioned:
  - Shipyard: Germaniawerft, Kiel
- Commander
- Fate: Construction abandoned on May 27, 1944, before keel was laid down.
- U-boat.net webpage for U-1607

== U-1608 ==
- Type: XX
- Construction
  - Laid Down:
  - Launched:
  - Commissioned:
  - Shipyard: Germaniawerft, Kiel
- Commander
- Fate: Construction abandoned on May 27, 1944, before keel was laid down.
- U-boat.net webpage for U-1608

== U-1609 ==
- Type: XX
- Construction
  - Laid Down:
  - Launched:
  - Commissioned:
  - Shipyard: Germaniawerft, Kiel
- Commander
- Fate: Construction abandoned on May 27, 1944, before keel was laid down.
- U-boat.net webpage for U-1609

== U-1610 ==
- Type: XX
- Construction
  - Laid Down:
  - Launched:
  - Commissioned:
  - Shipyard: Germaniawerft, Kiel
- Commander
- Fate: Construction abandoned on May 27, 1944, before keel was laid down.
- U-boat.net webpage for U-1610

== U-1611 ==
- Type: XX
- Construction
  - Laid Down:
  - Launched:
  - Commissioned:
  - Shipyard: Germaniawerft, Kiel
- Commander
- Fate: Construction abandoned on May 27, 1944, before keel was laid down.
- U-boat.net webpage for U-1611

== U-1612 ==
- Type: XX
- Construction
  - Laid Down:
  - Launched:
  - Commissioned:
  - Shipyard: Germaniawerft, Kiel
- Commander
- Fate: Construction abandoned on May 27, 1944, before keel was laid down.
- U-boat.net webpage for U-1612

== U-1613 ==
- Type: XX
- Construction
  - Laid Down:
  - Launched:
  - Commissioned:
  - Shipyard: Germaniawerft, Kiel
- Commander
- Fate: Construction abandoned on May 27, 1944, before keel was laid down.
- U-boat.net webpage for U-1613

== U-1614 ==
- Type: XX
- Construction
  - Laid Down:
  - Launched:
  - Commissioned:
  - Shipyard: Germaniawerft, Kiel
- Commander
- Fate: Construction abandoned on May 27, 1944, before keel was laid down.
- U-boat.net webpage for U-1614

== U-1615 ==
- Type: XX
- Construction
  - Laid Down:
  - Launched:
  - Commissioned:
  - Shipyard: Germaniawerft, Kiel
- Commander
- Fate: Construction abandoned on May 27, 1944, before keel was laid down.
- U-boat.net webpage for U-1615

== U-1701 ==
- Type: XX
- Construction
  - Laid Down:
  - Launched:
  - Commissioned:
  - Shipyard: Germaniawerft, Kiel
- Commander
- Fate: One of three (along with U-1702 and U-1703) built as hydrogen peroxide transporters. Work halted in the beginning of 1945 and broken up.
- U-boat.net webpage for U-1701

== U-1702 ==
- Type: XX
- Construction
  - Laid Down:
  - Launched:
  - Commissioned:
  - Shipyard: Germaniawerft, Kiel
- Commander
- Fate: One of three (along with U-1701 and U-1703) built as hydrogen peroxide transporters. Work halted in the beginning of 1945 and broken up.
- U-boat.net webpage for U-1702

== U-1703 ==
- Type: XX
- Construction
  - Laid Down:
  - Launched:
  - Commissioned:
  - Shipyard: Germaniawerft, Kiel
- Commander
- Fate: One of three (along with U-1701 and U-1702) built as hydrogen peroxide transporters. Work halted in the beginning of 1945 and broken up.
- U-boat.net webpage for U-1703

== U-1715 ==
- Type: XX
- Construction
  - Laid Down:
  - Launched:
  - Commissioned:
  - Shipyard: Germaniawerft, Kiel
- Commander
- Fate: Construction abandoned on May 27, 1944, before keel was laid down.
- U-boat.net webpage for U-1715

== U-1801 ==
- Type: VIIC/41
- Construction
  - Laid Down:
  - Launched:
  - Commissioned:
  - Shipyard: Danziger Werft, Danzig
- Commander
- Fate: Suspended September 30, 1943 and cancelled July 22, 1944.
- U-boat.net webpage for U-1801

== U-1828 ==
- Type: VIIC/41
- Construction
  - Laid Down:
  - Launched:
  - Commissioned:
  - Shipyard: Danziger Werft, Danzig
- Commander
- Fate: Suspended September 30, 1943 and cancelled November 6, 1943.
- U-boat.net webpage for U-1828

== U-1901 ==
- Type: VIIC/42
- Construction
  - Laid Down:
  - Launched:
  - Commissioned:
  - Shipyard: Kriegsmarinewerft, Wilhelmshaven
- Commander
- Fate: Suspended September 30, 1943 and cancelled November 6, 1943.
- U-boat.net webpage for U-1901

== U-1904 ==
- Type: VIIC/42
- Construction
  - Laid Down:
  - Launched:
  - Commissioned:
  - Shipyard: Kriegsmarinewerft, Wilhelmshaven
- Commander
- Fate: Suspended September 30, 1943 and cancelled November 6, 1943.
- U-boat.net webpage for U-1904

== U-2001 ==
- Type: VIIC/42
- Construction
  - Laid Down:
  - Launched:
  - Commissioned:
  - Shipyard: Howaldswerke, Hamburg
- Commander
- Fate: Cancelled November 6, 1943.
- U-boat.net webpage for U-2001

== U-2004 ==
- Type: VIIC/42
- Construction
  - Laid Down:
  - Launched:
  - Commissioned:
  - Shipyard: Howaldswerke, Hamburg
- Commander
- Fate: Cancelled November 6, 1943.
- U-boat.net webpage for U-2004

== U-2101 ==
- Type: VIIC/42
- Construction
  - Laid Down:
  - Launched:
  - Commissioned:
  - Shipyard: Germaniawerft, Kiel
- Commander
- Fate: Construction suspended September 30, 1943.
- U-boat.net webpage for U-2101

== U-2104 ==
- Type: VIIC/42
- Construction
  - Laid Down:
  - Launched:
  - Commissioned:
  - Shipyard: Germaniawerft, Kiel
- Commander
- Fate: Construction suspended September 30, 1943.
- U-boat.net webpage for U-2101

== U-2201 ==
- Type: XIV
- Construction
  - Laid Down:
  - Launched:
  - Commissioned:
  - Shipyard: Germaniawerft, Kiel
- Commander
- Fate: Construction suspended on June 3, 1944, and cancelled September 23, 1944.
- U-boat.net webpage for U-2201

== U-2202 ==
- Type: XIV
- Construction
  - Laid Down:
  - Launched:
  - Commissioned:
  - Shipyard: Germaniawerft, Kiel
- Commander
- Fate: Construction suspended on June 3, 1944, and cancelled September 23, 1944.
- U-boat.net webpage for U-2202

== U-2203 ==
- Type: XIV
- Construction
  - Laid Down:
  - Launched:
  - Commissioned:
  - Shipyard: Germaniawerft, Kiel
- Commander
- Fate: Construction suspended on June 3, 1944, and cancelled September 23, 1944.
- U-boat.net webpage for U-2203

== U-2204 ==
- Type: XIV
- Construction
  - Laid Down:
  - Launched:
  - Commissioned:
  - Shipyard: Germaniawerft, Kiel
- Commander
- Fate: Construction suspended on June 3, 1944, and cancelled September 23, 1944.
- U-boat.net webpage for U-2204

== U-2301 ==
- Type: VIIC/42
- Construction
  - Laid Down:
  - Launched:
  - Commissioned:
  - Shipyard: Schichau Werke, Danzig
- Commander
- Fate: Construction suspended September 30, 1943 and cancelled on November 6, 1943.
- U-boat.net webpage for U-2301

== U-2323 ==
- Type: XXIII
- Construction
  - Laid Down: April 11, 1944
  - Launched: May 31, 1944
  - Commissioned: July 18, 1944
  - Shipyard: Deutsche Werft, Hamburg
- Commander
  - Walter Angermann
- Fate: Sank off Möltenort by a mine on July 26, 1944, on her maiden voyage, killing two crew. Raised in early 1945 and was still under repairs when Germany surrendered. Broken up in place after WWII.
- U-boat.net webpage for U-2323

== U-2327 ==
- Type: XXIII
- Construction
  - Laid Down: May 16, 1944
  - Launched: July 29, 1944
  - Commissioned: August 19, 1944
  - Shipyard: Deutsche Werft, Hamburg
- Commander
  - Heinrich Mürl
  - Werner Müller
  - Hans-Walter Pahl
  - Hermann Schulz
- Fate: Scuttled at Kiel on May 2, 1945, as part of Operation Regenbogen. Later raised and broken up.
- U-boat.net webpage for U-2327

== U-2331 ==
- Type: XXIII
- Construction
  - Laid Down: June 30, 1944
  - Launched: August 22, 1944
  - Commissioned: September 12, 1944
  - Shipyard: Deutsche Werft, Hamburg
- Commander
  - Hans-Walter Pahl
- Fate: Sank by accident near Hela, killing 15 crew. Later raised and towed to Gotenhafen (now Gdynia) and broken up for scrap.
- U-boat.net webpage for U-2331

== U-2332 ==
- Type: XXIII
- Construction
  - Laid Down: September 20, 1944
  - Launched: October 18, 1944
  - Commissioned: November 13, 1944
  - Shipyard: Friedrich Krupp Germaniawerft, Kiel
- Commander
  - Dieter Bornkessel
- Fate: Scuttled at Hamburg on May 3, 1945, as part of Operation Regenbogen. Later raised and broken up.
- U-boat.net webpage for U-2332

== U-2333 ==
- Type: XXIII
- Construction
  - Laid Down: September 27, 1944
  - Launched: November 16, 1944
  - Commissioned: December 18, 1944
  - Shipyard: Friedrich Krupp Germaniawerft, Kiel
- Commander
  - Heinz Baumann
- Fate: Scuttled in Gelting Bay on May 3, 1945, as part of Operation Regenbogen. Later raised and broken up.
- U-boat.net webpage for U-2333

== U-2337 ==
- Type: XXIII
- Construction
  - Laid Down: August 2, 1944
  - Launched: September 15, 1944
  - Commissioned: October 4, 1944
  - Shipyard: Deutsche Werft, Hamburg
- Commander
  - Günter Behnisch
- Fate: Surrendered at Kristiansand Süd, Norway on May 9, 1945. Transferred to Loch Ryan, Scotland on May 29, 1945, for Operation Deadlight and sunk by gunfire from HMS Onslow and ORP Piorun on November 28, 1945.
- U-boat.net webpage for U-2337

== U-2338 ==
- Type: XXIII
- Construction
  - Laid Down: August 10, 1944
  - Launched: September 18, 1944
  - Commissioned: October 9, 1944
  - Shipyard: Deutsche Werft, Hamburg
- Commander
  - Hans-Dietrich Kaiser
- Fate: Sunk by RAF British Beaufighters of 236 Squadron and 254 Squadron on May 4, 1945, killing 12 crew. Raised in 1952 and broken up.
- U-boat.net webpage for U-2338

== U-2339 ==
- Type: XXIII
- Construction
  - Laid Down: August 15, 1944
  - Launched: September 22, 1944
  - Commissioned: November 16, 1944
  - Shipyard: Deutsche Werft, Hamburg
- Commander
  - Germanus Woermann
- Fate: Scuttled on May 5, 1945, in Gelting Bay. Later raised and broken up.
- U-boat.net webpage for U-2339

== U-2340 ==
- Type: XXIII
- Construction
  - Laid Down: August 18, 1944
  - Launched: September 28, 1944
  - Commissioned: October 16, 1944
  - Shipyard: Deutsche Werft, Hamburg
- Commander
  - Emil Klusmeier
- Fate: Sunk at Hamburg during a British bombing run on March 30, 1945. Later raised and broken up.
- U-boat.net webpage for U-2340

== U-2341 ==
- Type: XXIII
- Construction
  - Laid Down: August 23, 1944
  - Launched: October 3, 1944
  - Commissioned: October 21, 1944
  - Shipyard: Deutsche Werft, Hamburg
- Commander
  - Hermann Böhm
- Fate: Surrendered at Cuxhaven, Germany on May 5, 1945. Taken to Lisahally, Northern Ireland on June 21, 1945, for Operation Deadlight and sunk by gunfire from HMS Onslaught and Błyskawica on December 31, 1945.
- U-boat.net webpage for U-2341

== U-2342 ==
- Type: XXIII
- Construction
  - Laid Down: August 29, 1944
  - Launched: October 13, 1944
  - Commissioned: November 1, 1944
  - Shipyard: Deutsche Werft, Hamburg
- Commander
  - Berchthold Schad von Mittelbiberach
- Fate: Sunk in the Baltic Sea north of Swinemünde by a mine on December 20, 1944, killing seven crew. Wreck still in place in August 1953 and blown up in late October or November 1954. Remainder of wreck taken ashore and broken up for scrap.
- U-boat.net webpage for U-2342

== U-2343 ==
- Type: XXIII
- Construction
  - Laid Down: August 31, 1944
  - Launched: October 18, 1944
  - Commissioned: November 6, 1944
  - Shipyard: Deutsche Werft, Hamburg
- Commander
  - Harald Fuhlendorf
  - Hans-Ludwig Gaude
- Fate: Scuttled in or near Gelting Bay on May 5, 1945, as part of Operation Regenbogen. Later raised and broken up.
- U-boat.net webpage for U-2343

== U-2344 ==
- Type: XXIII
- Construction
  - Laid Down: September 4, 1944
  - Launched: October 24, 1944
  - Commissioned: November 10, 1944
  - Shipyard: Deutsche Werft, Kiel
- Commander
  - Hermann Ellerlage
- Fate: Sank north of Heiligendamm on February 18, 1945, following a collision with U-2336, killing 10 crew. Raised on January 22, 1955, and taken to Rostock, measured and conserved, but never repaired. Broken up at Rostock in 1958.
- U-boat.net webpage for U-2344

== U-2345 ==
- Type: XXIII
- Construction
  - Laid Down: September 7, 1944
  - Launched: October 28, 1944
  - Commissioned: November 15, 1944
  - Shipyard: Deutsche Werft, Hamburg
- Commander
  - Karl Steffen
- Fate: Surrendered at Stavanger, Norway on May 9, 1945. Transferred to Loch Ryan, Scotland on June 30, 1945, for Operation Deadlight. Scuttled on November 27, 1945.
- U-boat.net webpage for U-2345

== U-2346 ==
- Type: XXIII
- Construction
  - Laid Down: September 14, 1944
  - Launched: October 31, 1944
  - Commissioned: November 20, 1944
  - Shipyard: Deutsche Werft, Hamburg
- Commander
  - Hermann von der Höh
- Fate: Scuttled in Gelting Bay on May 5, 1945, as part of Operation Regenbogen. Later raised and broken up.
- U-boat.net webpage for U-2346

== U-2347 ==
- Type: XXIII
- Construction
  - Laid Down: September 20, 1944
  - Launched: November 6, 1944
  - Commissioned: December 2, 1944
  - Shipyard: Deutsche Werft, Hamburg
- Commander
  - Willibald Ulbing
- Fate: Scuttled in Gelting Bay on May 5, 1945, as part of Operation Regenbogen. Later raised and broken up.
- U-boat.net webpage for U-2347

== U-2348 ==
- Type: XXIII
- Construction
  - Laid Down: September 22, 1944
  - Launched: November 11, 1944
  - Commissioned: December 4, 1944
  - Shipyard: Deutsche Werft, Hamburg
- Commander
  - Willibald Ulbing
- Fate: Surrendered at Stavanger, Norway on May 9, 1945. Transferred to Loch Ryan on May 27, 1945. Broken up at Belfast in April 1949.
- U-boat.net webpage for U-2348

== U-2349 ==
- Type: XXIII
- Construction
  - Laid Down: September 25, 1944
  - Launched: November 20, 1944
  - Commissioned: December 11, 1944
  - Shipyard: Deutsche Werft, Hamburg
- Commander
  - Hans-Georg Müller
- Fate: Scuttled in Gelting Bay on May 5, 1945, as part of Operation Regenbogen. Later raised and broken up.
- U-boat.net webpage for U-2349

== U-2350 ==
- Type: XXIII
- Construction
  - Laid Down: September 28, 1944
  - Launched: November 22, 1944
  - Commissioned: December 23, 1944
  - Shipyard: Deutsche Werft, Hamburg
- Commander
  - Werner Schauer
- Fate: Surrendered at Kristiansand Süd, Norway on May 9, 1945. Transferred to Loch Ryan, Scotland on May 29, 1945, for Operation Deadlight and sunk by gunfire from HMS Onslow and ORP Piorun on November 28, 1945.
- U-boat.net webpage for U-2350

== U-2351 ==
- Type: XXIII
- Construction
  - Laid Down: September 28, 1944
  - Launched: November 22, 1944
  - Commissioned: December 23, 1944
  - Shipyard: Deutsche Werft, Hamburg
- Commander
  - Werner Brückner
- Fate: Surrendered at Flensburg, Germany on May 5, 1945. Later transferred to Lisahally, Northern Ireland for Operation Deadlight and sunk by gunfire from HMS Offa on January 3, 1946.
- U-boat.net webpage for U-2351

== U-2352 ==
- Type: XXIII
- Construction
  - Laid Down: October 3, 1944
  - Launched: November 25, 1944
  - Commissioned: December 30, 1944
  - Shipyard: Deutsche Werft, Hamburg
- Commander
  - Sigmund Budzyn
- Fate: Scuttled at Hørav Hav, Denmark on May 5, 1945, as part of Operation Regenbogen. Later raised and broken up.
- U-boat.net webpage for U-2352

== U-2353 ==
- Type: XXIII
- Construction
  - Laid Down: October 10, 1944
  - Launched: December 6, 1944
  - Commissioned: January 9, 1945
  - Shipyard: Deutsche Werft, Hamburg
- Commander
  - Jürgen Hillmann
- Fate: Surrendered at Kristiansand Süd, Norway on May 9, 1945. Transferred to Loch Ryan, Scotland on May 29, 1945. Allocated to the Soviet Union by the TNC. Arrived at Libau (now Liepaja), Latvia on December 4, 1945, as British N-class N31. Allocated to the Soviet Baltic Fleet on February 13, 1946. Renamed M-51 on June 9, 1949, and transferred to reserve fleet as a training hulk on December 22, 1950. Struck from Soviet Navy list on March 17, 1952, and broken up for scrap in 1963.
- U-boat.net webpage for U-2353

== U-2354 ==
- Type: XXIII
- Construction
  - Laid Down: October 14, 1944
  - Launched: December 10, 1944
  - Commissioned: January 11, 1945
  - Shipyard: Deutsche Werft, Hamburg
- Commander
  - Hans-Dieter Wex
- Fate: Surrendered at Kristiansand Süd, Norway on May 9, 1945. Transferred to Loch Ryan, Scotland on May 29, 1945, for Operation Deadlight and sunk by gunfire from HMS Onslow on December 22, 1945.
- U-boat.net webpage for U-2354

== U-2355 ==
- Type: XXIII
- Construction
  - Laid Down: October 14, 1944
  - Launched: December 10, 1944
  - Commissioned: January 11, 1945
  - Shipyard: Deutsche Werft, Hamburg
- Commander
  - Hans-Dieter Wex
- Fate: Surrendered at Kristiansand Süd, Norway on May 9, 1945. Transferred to Loch Ryan, Scotland on May 29, 1945, for Operation Deadlight and sunk by gunfire from HMS Onslow on December 22, 1945.
- U-boat.net webpage for U-2355

== U-2356 ==
- Type: XXIII
- Construction
  - Laid Down: October 21, 1944
  - Launched: December 19, 1944
  - Commissioned: January 12, 1945
  - Shipyard: Deutsche Werft, Hamburg
- Commander
  - Friedrich Hartel
- Fate: Surrendered at Cuxhaven, Germany on May 5, 1945. Taken to Lisahally, Northern Ireland on June 21, 1945, for Operation Deadlight and sunk by gunfire from HMS Onslaught on January 6, 1946.
- U-boat.net webpage for U-2356

== U-2357 ==
- Type: XXIII
- Construction
  - Laid Down: October 21, 1944
  - Launched: December 20, 1944
  - Commissioned: January 13, 1945
  - Shipyard: Deutsche Werft, Hamburg
- Commander
  - Erwin Heinrich
- Fate: Scuttled in Gelting Bay on May 5, 1945, as part of Operation Regenbogen. Later raised and broken up.
- U-boat.net webpage for U-2357

== U-2358 ==
- Type: XXIII
- Construction
  - Laid Down: November 1, 1944
  - Launched: December 22, 1944
  - Commissioned: January 16, 1945
  - Shipyard: Deutsche Werft, Hamburg
- Commander
  - Gerhard Breun
- Fate: Scuttled in Gelting Bay on May 5, 1945, as part of Operation Regenbogen. Later raised and broken up.
- U-boat.net webpage for U-2358

== U-2359 ==
- Type: XXIII
- Construction
  - Laid Down: November 3, 1944
  - Launched: December 23, 1944
  - Commissioned: January 16, 1945
  - Shipyard: Deutsche Werft, Hamburg
- Commander
  - Gustav Bischoff
- Fate: Sunk in the Kattegat on May 2, 1945, by rockets from British Mosquito aircraft (143 Squadron, 235 Squadron and 236 Squadron), Norwegian Mosquito aircraft (333 Squadron) and Canadian Mosquito Aircraft (RCAF 404).
- U-boat.net webpage for U-2359

== U-2360 ==
- Type: XXIII
- Construction
  - Laid Down: November 7, 1944
  - Launched: December 29, 1944
  - Commissioned: January 23, 1945
  - Shipyard: Deutsche Werft, Hamburg
- Commander
  - Kurt Schrobach
- Fate: Scuttled in Gelting Bay on May 5, 1945, as part of Operation Regenbogen. Later raised and broken up.
- U-boat.net webpage for U-2360

== U-2361 ==
- Type: XXIII
- Construction
  - Laid Down: November 12, 1944
  - Launched: January 3, 1945
  - Commissioned: February 3, 1945
  - Shipyard: Deutsche Werft, Hamburg
- Commander
  - Heinz von Henning
- Fate: Surrendered at Kristiansand Süd, Norway on May 9, 1945. Transferred to Loch Ryan, Scotland on May 29, 1945, for Operation Deadlight and sunk by gunfire from HMS Onslow and Błyskawica on November 27, 1945.
- U-boat.net webpage for U-2361

== U-2362 ==
- Type: XXIII
- Construction
  - Laid Down: November 22, 1944
  - Launched: January 11, 1945
  - Commissioned: February 5, 1945
  - Shipyard: Deutsche Werft, Hamburg
- Commander
  - Martin Czekowski
- Fate: Scuttled in Gelting Bay on May 5, 1945, as part of Operation Regenbogen. Later raised and broken up.
- U-boat.net webpage for U-2362

== U-2363 ==
- Type: XXIII
- Construction
  - Laid Down: November 22, 1944
  - Launched: January 18, 1945
  - Commissioned: February 5, 1945
  - Shipyard: Deutsche Werft, Hamburg
- Commander
  - Karl Frahm
- Fate: Surrendered at Kristiansand Süd, Norway on May 9, 1945. Transferred to Loch Ryan, Scotland on May 29, 1945, for Operation Deadlight and sunk by gunfire from HMS Onslow and ORP Piorun on November 28, 1945.
- U-boat.net webpage for U-2363

== U-2364 ==
- Type: XXIII
- Construction
  - Laid Down: November 27, 1944
  - Launched: January 23, 1945
  - Commissioned: February 14, 1945
  - Shipyard: Deutsche Werft, Hamburg
- Commander
  - Dieter Hengen
  - Gerhard Remus
- Fate: Scuttled in Gelting Bay on May 5, 1945, as part of Operation Regenbogen. Later raised and broken up.
- U-boat.net webpage for U-2364

== U-2365 ==
- Type: XXIII
- Construction
  - Laid Down: December 6, 1944
  - Launched: January 26, 1945
  - Commissioned: March 2, 1945
  - Shipyard: Deutsche Werft, Hamburg
- Commander
  - Fritz-Otto Korfmann
  - Uwe Christiansen
- Fate: Scuttled in the Kattegat, northwest of Anholt island on May 8, 1945, as part of Operation Regenbogen. Raised in June 1956 and commissioned as West German submarine Hai on August 15, 1957.
- U-boat.net webpage for U-2365

== U-2366 ==
- Type: XXIII
- Construction
  - Laid Down: December 6, 1944
  - Launched: February 17, 1945
  - Commissioned: March 10, 1945
  - Shipyard: Deutsche Werft, Hamburg
- Commander
  - Kurt Jäckel
- Fate: Scuttled in Gelting Bay on May 3, 1945, as part of Operation Regenbogen. Later raised and broken up.
- U-boat.net webpage for U-2366

== U-2367 ==
- Type: XXIII
- Construction
  - Laid Down: December 11, 1944
  - Launched: February 23, 1945
  - Commissioned: March 17, 1945
  - Shipyard: Deutsche Werft, Hamburg
- Commander
  - Heinrich Schröder
- Fate: Sank near Schleimünde on May 5, 1945, following a collision with another U-boat. Raised in August 1956 and commissioned as West German submarine Hecht on October 1, 1957.
- U-boat.net webpage for U-2367

== U-2368 ==
- Type: XXIII
- Construction
  - Laid Down: December 15, 1944
  - Launched: March 29, 1945
  - Commissioned: April 11, 1945
  - Shipyard: Deutsche Werft, Hamburg
- Commander
  - Fritz Ufermann
- Fate: Scuttled in Gelting Bay on May 3, 1945, as part of Operation Regenbogen. Later raised and broken up.
- U-boat.net webpage for U-2368

== U-2369 ==
- Type: XXIII
- Construction
  - Laid Down: December 20, 1944
  - Launched: March 24, 1945
  - Commissioned: April 18, 1945
  - Shipyard: Deutsche Werft, Hamburg
- Commander
  - Hermann Schulz
- Fate: Scuttled in Gelting Bay on May 3, 1945, as part of Operation Regenbogen. Later raised and broken up.
- U-boat.net webpage for U-2369

== U-2370 ==
- Type: XXIII
- Construction
  - Laid Down: December 20, 1944
  - Launched:
  - Commissioned:
  - Shipyard: Deutsche Werft, Hamburg
- Commander
- Fate: Some sources state U-2370 was commissioned on April 15, 1944. However, according to planned commander Oblt. Bornkesser the submarine was never commissioned and was scuttled unfinished on May 3, 1945, at the Fink II bunker in Hamburg.
- U-boat.net webpage for U-2370

== U-2371 ==
- Type: XXIII
- Construction
  - Laid Down: January 19, 1945
  - Launched: April 18, 1945
  - Commissioned: April 24, 1945
  - Shipyard: Deutsche Werft, Hamburg
- Commander
  - Johannes Kühne
- Fate: Scuttled at Hamburg on May 3, 1945, as part of Operation Regenbogen. Later raised and broken up.
- U-boat.net webpage for U-2371

== U-2401 ==
- Type: XXIII
- Construction
  - Laid Down: June 1944
  - Launched:
  - Commissioned:
  - Shipyard: Ansaldo, Genoa
- Commander
- Fate: Keel laid down in June 1944, never completed. Cancelled August 24, 1944.
- U-boat.net webpage for U-2401

== U-2402 ==
- Type: XXIII
- Construction
  - Laid Down: June 1944
  - Launched:
  - Commissioned:
  - Shipyard: Ansaldo, Genoa
- Commander
- Fate: Keel laid down in June 1944, never completed. Cancelled August 24, 1944.
- U-boat.net webpage for U-2402

== U-2403 ==
- Type: XXIII
- Construction
  - Laid Down: July 1944
  - Launched:
  - Commissioned:
  - Shipyard: Ansaldo, Genoa
- Commander
- Fate: Keel laid down in July 1944, never completed. Cancelled August 24, 1944.
- U-boat.net webpage for U-2403

== U-2404 ==
- Type: XXIII
- Construction
  - Laid Down: July 1944
  - Launched:
  - Commissioned:
  - Shipyard: Ansaldo, Genoa
- Commander
- Fate: Keel laid down in July 1944, never completed. Cancelled August 24, 1944.
- U-boat.net webpage for U-2404

== U-2431 ==
- Type: XXIII
- Construction
  - Laid Down: June 12, 1944
  - Launched:
  - Commissioned:
  - Shipyard: C.R.D.A, Monfalcone
- Commander
- Fate: Never completed.
- U-boat.net webpage for U-2431

== U-2432 ==
- Type: XXIII
- Construction
  - Laid Down: June 16, 1944
  - Launched:
  - Commissioned:
  - Shipyard: C.R.D.A, Monfalcone
- Commander
- Fate: Never completed.
- U-boat.net webpage for U-2432

== U-2513 ==
- Type: XXI
- Construction
  - Laid Down: July 19, 1944
  - Launched: September 19, 1944
  - Commissioned: October 12, 1944
  - Shipyard: Blohm & Voss, Hamburg
- Commander
  - Hans Bungards
  - Erich Topp
- Fate: Surrendered at Horten, Norway on May 9, 1945. Transferred to Oslo on May 18, 1945. Departed Oslo on June 3, 1945, for Lisahally, Northern Ireland, arriving there on June 9. Secretly transferred to the US in August 1945 and escorted by USS Brant to New London, Connecticut, arriving there on August 25. Refitted at Portsmouth, New Hampshire and used for trials and training. Sunk west of Key West, Florida during rocket testing by USS Robert A. Owens on October 7, 1951.
- U-boat.net webpage for U-2513

== U-2518 ==
- Type: XXI
- Construction
  - Laid Down: August 16, 1944
  - Launched: October 4, 1944
  - Commissioned: November 4, 1944
  - Shipyard: Blohm & Voss, Hamburg
- Commander
  - Friedrich Weidner
- Fate: Surrendered at Horten, Norway on May 9, 1945. Transferred to Oslo on May 18, 1945. Departed Oslo on June 3, 1945, for Lisahally, Northern Ireland, arriving there on June 7. Transferred to France on February 14, 1946, and renamed Roland Morillot on February 14, 1951.
- U-boat.net webpage for U-2518

== U-2529 ==
- Type: XXI
- Construction
  - Laid Down: September 29, 1944
  - Launched: November 13, 1944
  - Commissioned: February 22, 1945
  - Shipyard: Blohm & Voss, Hamburg
- Commander
  - Karl-Heinrich Feufel
  - Fritz Kallipke
- Fate: Surrendered at Kristiansand Süd, Norway on May 9, 1945. Departed Kristiansand on June 3, 1945, for Lisahally, Northern Ireland, arriving there on June 6. Allocated to the Soviet Union by the TNC. Arrived at Libau (now Liepaja), Latvia on December 4, 1945, as British N-class N27. Allocated to the Soviet Baltic Fleet on February 13, 1946. Renamed to Soviet B-class B-27 on June 9, 1949. Sent to reserve on June 10, 1955. Redesignated to block ship BSh-28 on September 19, 1955, and to stationary training submarine UTS-3 on January 9, 1957. Struck from the Soviet Navy on September 1, 1972, and broken up.

Another source states that as of March 1951 B-27 was assigned to the 158th Submarine Brigade of the 27th Submarine Division; she was converted to floating charging station PZS-34 on January 18, 1956. On 25 March 1958 she was struck from the Soviet Navy and sold for scrap.

- U-boat.net webpage for U-2529

== U-2532 ==
- Type: XXI
- Construction
  - Laid Down: October 10, 1944
  - Launched: December 7, 1944
  - Commissioned:
  - Shipyard: Blohm & Voss, Hamburg
- Commander
- Fate: Sunk at yard during bombing raid on December 31, 1944, and again on January 17, 1945.
- U-boat.net webpage for U-2532

== U-2533 ==
- Type: XXI
- Construction
  - Laid Down: October 13, 1944
  - Launched: December 7, 1944
  - Commissioned: January 18, 1945
  - Shipyard: Blohm & Voss, Hamburg
- Commander
  - Horst Günther
- Fate: Scuttled at Travemünde on May 3, 1945. Later broken up.
- U-boat.net webpage for U-2533

== U-2534 ==
- Type: XXI
- Construction
  - Laid Down: October 23, 1944
  - Launched: December 11, 1944
  - Commissioned: January 17, 1945
  - Shipyard: Blohm & Voss, Hamburg
- Commander
  - Ulrich Drews
- Fate: Scuttled east of Fehmarn island on May 3, 1945.
- U-boat.net webpage for U-2534

== U-2535 ==
- Type: XXI
- Construction
  - Laid Down: October 19, 1944
  - Launched: December 16, 1944
  - Commissioned: January 28, 1945
  - Shipyard: Blohm & Voss, Hamburg
- Commander
  - Otto Bitter
- Fate: Scuttled at Travemünde on May 3, 1945. Later raised and broken up.
- U-boat.net webpage for U-2535

== U-2536 ==
- Type: XXI
- Construction
  - Laid Down: October 21, 1944
  - Launched: December 16, 1944
  - Commissioned: February 6, 1945
  - Shipyard: Blohm & Voss, Hamburg
- Commander
  - Ulrich Vöge
- Fate: Scuttled at Travemünde on May 3, 1945. Later broken up.
- U-boat.net webpage for U-2536

== U-2537 ==
- Type: XXI
- Construction
  - Laid Down: October 10, 1944
  - Launched: December 7, 1944
  - Commissioned:
  - Shipyard: Blohm & Voss, Hamburg
- Commander
- Fate: Sunk at yard during bombing raid on December 31, 1944.
- U-boat.net webpage for U-2537

== U-2538 ==
- Type: XXI
- Construction
  - Laid Down: October 24, 1944
  - Launched: January 6, 1945
  - Commissioned: February 16, 1945
  - Shipyard: Blohm & Voss, Hamburg
- Commander
  - Heinrich Klapdor
- Fate: Scuttled off Ærø on May 3, 1945. Later raised and broken up in 1950.
- U-boat.net webpage for U-2538

== U-2539 ==
- Type: XXI
- Construction
  - Laid Down: October 27, 1944
  - Launched: January 6, 1945
  - Commissioned: February 21, 1945
  - Shipyard: Blohm & Voss, Hamburg
- Commander
  - Erich Jewinski
- Fate: Scuttled at Kiel on May 3, 1945. Later raised and broken up.
- U-boat.net webpage for U-2539

== U-2546 ==
- Type: XXI
- Construction
  - Laid Down: November 22, 1944
  - Launched: February 19, 1945
  - Commissioned: March 21, 1945
  - Shipyard: Blohm & Voss, Hamburg
- Commander
  - Max Dobbert
- Fate: Scuttled at Kiel on May 3, 1945. Later raised and broken up.
- U-boat.net webpage for U-2546

== U-2547 ==
- Type: XXI
- Construction
  - Laid Down: November 27, 1944
  - Launched: March 9, 1945
  - Commissioned:
  - Shipyard: Blohm & Voss, Hamburg
- Commander
- Fate: Bombed while being built on March 11, 1945.
- U-boat.net webpage for U-2547

== U-2548 ==
- Type: XXI
- Construction
  - Laid Down: November 27, 1944
  - Launched: March 9, 1945
  - Commissioned:
  - Shipyard: Blohm & Voss, Hamburg
- Commander
  - Karl-Ernst Utischill
- Fate: Scuttled at Kiel on May 3, 1945, as part of Operation Regenbogen. Later raised and broken up.
- U-boat.net webpage for U-2548

== U-2549 ==
- Type: XXI
- Construction
  - Laid Down: November 27, 1944
  - Launched: March 9, 1945
  - Commissioned:
  - Shipyard: Blohm & Voss, Hamburg
- Commander
- Fate: Bombed while being built on March 11, 1945.
- U-boat.net webpage for U-2549

== U-2550 ==
- Type: XXI
- Construction
  - Laid Down: November 27, 1944
  - Launched: March 9, 1945
  - Commissioned:
  - Shipyard: Blohm & Voss, Hamburg
- Commander
- Fate: Bombed while being built on March 11, 1945.
- U-boat.net webpage for U-2550

== U-2551 ==
- Type: XXI
- Construction
  - Laid Down: December 8, 1944
  - Launched: March 31, 1945
  - Commissioned: April 24, 1945
  - Shipyard: Blohm & Voss, Hamburg
- Commander
  - Gerhard Schaar
- Fate: Deliberately run aground by its crew at Solitüde Spit near Flensburg on May 5, 1945. Blown up by the Royal Navy on May 23, 1945, and then broken up.
- U-boat.net webpage for U-2551

== U-2552 ==
- Type: XXI
- Construction
  - Laid Down: December 10, 1944
  - Launched: March 31, 1945
  - Commissioned: April 21, 1945
  - Shipyard: Blohm & Voss, Hamburg
- Commander
  - Johannes Rudolph
- Fate: Scuttled in Kiel harbor southwest of buoy B2 on May 3, 1945, as part of Operation Regenbogen. Later raised and broken up.
- U-boat.net webpage for U-2552

== U-2553 ==
- Type: XXI
- Construction
  - Laid Down: December 12, 1944
  - Launched:
  - Commissioned:
  - Shipyard: Blohm & Voss, Hamburg
- Commander
- Fate: Still unfinished at the end of the war, broken up on stocks in 1945–1946.
- U-boat.net webpage for U-2553

== U-2554 ==
- Type: XXI
- Construction
  - Laid Down: December 14, 1944
  - Launched:
  - Commissioned:
  - Shipyard: Blohm & Voss, Hamburg
- Commander
- Fate: Still unfinished at the end of the war, broken up on stocks in 1945–1946.
- U-boat.net webpage for U-2554

== U-2555 ==
- Type: XXI
- Construction
  - Laid Down: December 20, 1944
  - Launched:
  - Commissioned:
  - Shipyard: Blohm & Voss, Hamburg
- Commander
- Fate: Still unfinished at the end of the war, broken up on stocks in 1945–1946.
- U-boat.net webpage for U-2555

== U-2556 ==
- Type: XXI
- Construction
  - Laid Down: December 23, 1944
  - Launched:
  - Commissioned:
  - Shipyard: Blohm & Voss, Hamburg
- Commander
- Fate: Still unfinished at the end of the war, broken up on stocks in 1945–1946.
- U-boat.net webpage for U-2556

== U-2557 ==
- Type: XXI
- Construction
  - Laid Down: December 30, 1944
  - Launched:
  - Commissioned:
  - Shipyard: Blohm & Voss, Hamburg
- Commander
- Fate: Still unfinished at the end of the war, broken up on stocks in 1945–1946.
- U-boat.net webpage for U-2557

== U-2558 ==
- Type: XXI
- Construction
  - Laid Down: February 1, 1945
  - Launched:
  - Commissioned:
  - Shipyard: Blohm & Voss, Hamburg
- Commander
- Fate: Still unfinished at the end of the war, broken up on stocks in 1945–1946.
- U-boat.net webpage for U-2558

== U-2559 ==
- Type: XXI
- Construction
  - Laid Down: February 4, 1945
  - Launched:
  - Commissioned:
  - Shipyard: Blohm & Voss, Hamburg
- Commander
- Fate: Still unfinished at the end of the war, broken up on stocks in 1945–1946.
- U-boat.net webpage for U-2559

== U-2560 ==
- Type: XXI
- Construction
  - Laid Down: February 12, 1945
  - Launched:
  - Commissioned:
  - Shipyard: Blohm & Voss, Hamburg
- Commander
- Fate: Still unfinished at the end of the war, broken up on stocks in 1945–1946.
- U-boat.net webpage for U-2560

== U-2561 ==
- Type: XXI
- Construction
  - Laid Down: February 15, 1945
  - Launched:
  - Commissioned:
  - Shipyard: Blohm & Voss, Hamburg
- Commander
- Fate: Still unfinished at the end of the war, broken up on stocks in 1945–1946.
- U-boat.net webpage for U-2561

== U-2562 ==
- Type: XXI
- Construction
  - Laid Down: February 24, 1945
  - Launched:
  - Commissioned:
  - Shipyard: Blohm & Voss, Hamburg
- Commander
- Fate: Still unfinished at the end of the war, broken up on stocks in 1945–1946.
- U-boat.net webpage for U-2562

== U-2563 ==
- Type: XXI
- Construction
  - Laid Down: February 28, 1945
  - Launched:
  - Commissioned:
  - Shipyard: Blohm & Voss, Hamburg
- Commander
- Fate: Still unfinished at the end of the war, broken up on stocks in 1945–1946.
- U-boat.net webpage for U-2563

== U-2564 ==
- Type: XXI
- Construction
  - Laid Down: March 29, 1945
  - Launched:
  - Commissioned:
  - Shipyard: Blohm & Voss, Hamburg
- Commander
- Fate: Still unfinished at the end of the war, broken up on stocks in 1945–1946.
- U-boat.net webpage for U-2564

== U-3001 ==
- Type: XXI
- Construction
  - Laid Down: April 15, 1944
  - Launched: May 30, 1944
  - Commissioned: July 20, 1944
  - Shipyard: AG Weser, Bremen
- Commander
  - Hans Vogel
- Fate: Scuttled northwest of Wesermünde on May 3, 1945. Later raised and broken up.
- U-boat.net webpage for U-3001

== U-3017 ==
- Type: XXI
- Construction
  - Laid Down: September 2, 1944
  - Launched: November 5, 1944
  - Commissioned: January 5, 1945
  - Shipyard: AG Weser, Bremen
- Commander
  - Rolf Lindschau
- Fate: Surrendered at Horten, Norway on May 9, 1945. Transferred to Oslo on May 18. Left Oslo on June 3, 1945, for Lisahally, Northern Ireland, arriving there on June 7. Transferred to Britain and commissioned as British N-class N41. Used for tests; broken up at Newport, Wales in November 1949.
- U-boat.net webpage for U-3017

== U-3035 ==
- Type: XXI
- Construction
  - Laid Down: November 11, 1944
  - Launched: January 24, 1945
  - Commissioned: March 1, 1945
  - Shipyard: AG Weser, Bremen
- Commander
  - Ernst-August Gerke
- Fate: Surrendered at Stavanger, Norway on May 9, 1945. Left Stavanger on May 31, 1945, for Scapa Flow, Scotland, arriving there on June 2. Left Scapa Flow the same day for Lisahally, Northern Ireland, arriving there on June 4. Allocated by the TNC to the Soviet Union. Arrived at Libau (now Liepaja), Latvia on December 10, 1945, as British N-class N28. Allocated to the Soviet Baltic Fleet on February 13, 1946, and renamed N-29. Renamed as Soviet B-class B-29 on June 9, 1949. Transferred to reserve on December 29, 1955. Redesignated as charging station PZS-34 on January 18, 1956. Struck from Soviet Navy list on March 25, 1958, and sold for scrap.
- U-boat.net webpage for U-3035

== U-3036 ==
- Type: XXI
- Construction
  - Laid Down: November 22, 1944
  - Launched: January 27, 1945
  - Commissioned:
  - Shipyard: AG Weser, Bremen
- Commander
- Fate: Sunk during air raid on March 30, 1945, while being fitted out.
- U-boat.net webpage for U-3036

== U-3041 ==
- Type: XXI
- Construction
  - Laid Down: December 7, 1944
  - Launched: February 15, 1945
  - Commissioned: March 10, 1945
  - Shipyard: AG Weser, Bremen
- Commander
  - Joachim Vieth
  - Hans Hornkohl
- Fate: Surrendered at Horten, Norway on May 9, 1945. Transferred to Oslo on May 18. Left Oslo on June 3, 1945, for Lisahally, Northern Ireland, arriving there on June 7. Allocated by the TNC to the Soviet Union. Arrived at Libau, Latvia on December 10, 1945, as British N-class N29. Allocated to the Soviet Baltic Fleet on February 13, 1946. Renamed as Soviet B-class B-29 on June 9, 1949. Transferred to reserve on December 29, 1955. Redesignated as charging station PZS-31 on January 18, 1956. Struck from Soviet Navy list on September 28, 1958, and sold for scrap on November 30.

Another source claims that B-29 was redesignated as PZS-35 and became experimental hulk B-100 on July 2, 1958. Struck from the Soviet Navy on September 25, 1959, and sold for scrap on November 30.

- U-boat.net webpage for U-3041

== U-3042 ==
- Type: XXI
- Construction
  - Laid Down: December 15, 1944
  - Launched:
  - Commissioned:
  - Shipyard: AG Weser, Bremen
- Commander
- Fate: Damaged in air raid while on slipways on February 22, 1945.
- U-boat.net webpage for U-3042

== U-3043 ==
- Type: XXI
- Construction
  - Laid Down: December 14, 1944
  - Launched:
  - Commissioned:
  - Shipyard: AG Weser, Bremen
- Commander
- Fate: Damaged in air raid while on slipways on February 22, 1945.
- U-boat.net webpage for U-3043

== U-3044 ==
- Type: XXI
- Construction
  - Laid Down: December 21, 1944
  - Launched: March 1, 1945
  - Commissioned: March 27, 1945
  - Shipyard: AG Weser, Bremen
- Commander
  - Bernhard Jaek
  - Detlef von Lehsten
- Fate: Scuttled in Gelting Bay on May 5, 1945, as part of Operation Regenbogen. Later raised and broken up.
- U-boat.net webpage for U-3044

== U-3045 ==
- Type: XXI
- Construction
  - Laid Down: December 20, 1944
  - Launched: March 6, 1945
  - Commissioned:
  - Shipyard: AG Weser, Bremen
- Commander
- Fate: Sunk during air raid on March 30, 1945, while being fitted out.
- U-boat.net webpage for U-3045

== U-3046 ==
- Type: XXI
- Construction
  - Laid Down: December 29, 1944
  - Launched: March 10, 1945
  - Commissioned:
  - Shipyard: AG Weser, Bremen
- Commander
- Fate: Sunk during air raid on March 30, 1945, while being fitted out.
- U-boat.net webpage for U-3046

== U-3047 ==
- Type: XXI
- Construction
  - Laid Down: January 3, 1945
  - Launched: April 11, 1945
  - Commissioned:
  - Shipyard: AG Weser, Bremen
- Commander
- Fate: Broken up because it was not ready for commission.
- U-boat.net webpage for U-3047

== U-3048 ==
- Type: XXI
- Construction
  - Laid Down: December 31, 1944
  - Launched:
  - Commissioned:
  - Shipyard: AG Weser, Bremen
- Commander
- Fate: Broken up because it was not ready for commission.
- U-boat.net webpage for U-3048

== U-3049 ==
- Type: XXI
- Construction
  - Laid Down: December 30, 1944
  - Launched:
  - Commissioned:
  - Shipyard: AG Weser, Bremen
- Commander
- Fate: Broken up because it was not ready for commission.
- U-boat.net webpage for U-3049

== U-3050 ==
- Type: XXI
- Construction
  - Laid Down: January 9, 1945
  - Launched: April 18, 1945
  - Commissioned:
  - Shipyard: AG Weser, Bremen
- Commander
- Fate: Broken up because it was not ready for commission.
- U-boat.net webpage for U-3050

== U-3051 ==
- Type: XXI
- Construction
  - Laid Down: January 8, 1945
  - Launched: April 20, 1945
  - Commissioned:
  - Shipyard: AG Weser, Bremen
- Commander
- Fate: Broken up because it was not ready for commission.
- U-boat.net webpage for U-3051

== U-3052 ==
- Type: XXI
- Construction
  - Laid Down: January 22, 1945
  - Launched:
  - Commissioned:
  - Shipyard: AG Weser, Bremen
- Commander
- Fate: Broken up on slipways.
- U-boat.net webpage for U-3052

== U-3053 ==
- Type: XXI
- Construction
  - Laid Down: January 25, 1945
  - Launched:
  - Commissioned:
  - Shipyard: AG Weser, Bremen
- Commander
- Fate: Broken up on slipways.
- U-boat.net webpage for U-3053

== U-3054 ==
- Type: XXI
- Construction
  - Laid Down: January 27, 1945
  - Launched:
  - Commissioned:
  - Shipyard: AG Weser, Bremen
- Commander
- Fate: Damaged in air raid on March 11, 1945. Broken up on slipways.
- U-boat.net webpage for U-3054

== U-3055 ==
- Type: XXI
- Construction
  - Laid Down: January 25, 1945
  - Launched:
  - Commissioned:
  - Shipyard: AG Weser, Bremen
- Commander
- Fate: Broken up on slipways.
- U-boat.net webpage for U-3055

== U-3056 ==
- Type: XXI
- Construction
  - Laid Down: February 7, 1945
  - Launched:
  - Commissioned:
  - Shipyard: AG Weser, Bremen
- Commander
- Fate: Broken up on slipways.
- U-boat.net webpage for U-3056

== U-3057 ==
- Type: XXI
- Construction
  - Laid Down: February 4, 1945
  - Launched:
  - Commissioned:
  - Shipyard: AG Weser, Bremen
- Commander
- Fate: Broken up on slipways.
- U-boat.net webpage for U-3057

== U-3058 ==
- Type: XXI
- Construction
  - Laid Down: February 17, 1945
  - Launched:
  - Commissioned:
  - Shipyard: AG Weser, Bremen
- Commander
- Fate: Broken up on slipways.
- U-boat.net webpage for U-3058

== U-3059 ==
- Type: XXI
- Construction
  - Laid Down: February 15, 1945
  - Launched:
  - Commissioned:
  - Shipyard: AG Weser, Bremen
- Commander
- Fate: Broken up on slipways.
- U-boat.net webpage for U-3059

== U-3060 ==
- Type: XXI
- Construction
  - Laid Down: February 25, 1945
  - Launched:
  - Commissioned:
  - Shipyard: AG Weser, Bremen
- Commander
- Fate: Broken up on slipways.
- U-boat.net webpage for U-3060

== U-3061 ==
- Type: XXI
- Construction
  - Laid Down: February 24, 1945
  - Launched:
  - Commissioned:
  - Shipyard: AG Weser, Bremen
- Commander
- Fate: Damaged in air raid on March 11, 1945. Broken up on slipways.
- U-boat.net webpage for U-3061

== U-3062 ==
- Type: XXI
- Construction
  - Laid Down: March 9, 1945
  - Launched:
  - Commissioned:
  - Shipyard: AG Weser, Bremen
- Commander
- Fate: Broken up on slipways.
- U-boat.net webpage for U-3062

== U-3063 ==
- Type: XXI
- Construction
  - Laid Down: March 7, 1945
  - Launched:
  - Commissioned:
  - Shipyard: AG Weser, Bremen
- Commander
- Fate: Broken up on slipways.
- U-boat.net webpage for U-3063

== U-3501 ==
- Type: XXI
- Construction
  - Laid Down: March 20, 1944
  - Launched: April 19, 1944
  - Commissioned: July 29, 1944
  - Shipyard: Schichau-Werke, Danzig
- Commander
  - Helmut Münster
  - Hans-Joachim Schmidt-Weichert
- Fate: Scuttled in the west side of the Weser estuary on May 5 (or May 1), 1945. Later broken up.
- U-boat.net webpage for U-3501

== U-3502 ==
- Type: XXI
- Construction
  - Laid Down: April 16, 1944
  - Launched: July 6, 1944
  - Commissioned: August 19, 1944
  - Shipyard: Schichau-Werke, Danzig
- Commander
  - Hermann Schultz
- Fate: Used as an electricity-producing boat; stern damaged by bombs and was removed from service at Hamburg on May 3, 1945. Later broken up.
- U-boat.net webpage for U-3502

== U-3503 ==
- Type: XXI
- Construction
  - Laid Down: June 17, 1944
  - Launched: July 27, 1944
  - Commissioned: September 9, 1944
  - Shipyard: Schichau-Werke, Danzig
- Commander
  - Hugo Deiring
- Fate: Scuttled in the Kattegat, west of Göteborg, Sweden on May 8, 1945, as part of Operation Regenbogen. Raised in 1946 and broken up.
- U-boat.net webpage for U-3503

== U-3504 ==
- Type: XXI
- Construction
  - Laid Down: June 30, 1944
  - Launched: August 15, 1944
  - Commissioned: September 23, 1944
  - Shipyard: Schichau-Werke, Danzig
- Commander
  - Kart-Hartwig Siebold
- Fate: Scuttled at Wilhelmshaven on May 2, 1945, as part of Operation Regenbogen. Later broken up.
- U-boat.net webpage for U-3504

== U-3505 ==
- Type: XXI
- Construction
  - Laid Down: July 9, 1944
  - Launched: August 25, 1944
  - Commissioned: October 7, 1944
  - Shipyard: Schichau-Werke, Danzig
- Commander
  - Horst Willner
- Fate: Sunk by bombs at Kiel on April 3, 1945. Wreck later broken up.
- U-boat.net webpage for U-3505

== U-3506 ==
- Type: XXI
- Construction
  - Laid Down: July 14, 1944
  - Launched: August 28, 1944
  - Commissioned: October 16, 1944
  - Shipyard: Schichau-Werke, Danzig
- Commander
  - Gerhard Thäter
- Fate: Scuttled in the Elbe II bunker at Hamburg on May 2, 1945, and not discovered until 1985. Wreckage still there, but covered in gravel. A parking lot now sits on top of the bunker site.
- U-boat.net webpage for U-3506

== U-3507 ==
- Type: XXI
- Construction
  - Laid Down: July 19, 1944
  - Launched: September 16, 1944
  - Commissioned: October 19, 1944
  - Shipyard: Schichau-Werke, Danzig
- Commander
  - Otto Niethmann
  - Hans-Jürgen Schley
- Fate: Scuttled at Travemünde on May 3, 1945, as part of Operation Regenbogen. Later raised and broken up.
- U-boat.net webpage for U-3507

== U-3508 ==
- Type: XXI
- Construction
  - Laid Down: July 25, 1944
  - Launched: September 22, 1944
  - Commissioned: November 2, 1944
  - Shipyard: Schichau-Werke, Danzig
- Commander
  - Detlef von Lehsten
- Fate: Sunk whilst empty in Wilhelmshaven by an Eighth Air Force raid on March 3, 1945. It was raised by engineers, but sunk again on March 30, 1945.
- U-boat.net webpage for U-3508

== U-3509 ==
- Type: XXI
- Construction
  - Laid Down: July 19, 1944
  - Launched: September 27, 1944
  - Commissioned: January 29, 1945
  - Shipyard: Schichau-Werke, Danzig
- Commanders
  - Hans Hornkohl
  - Karl-Hein Vosswinkel
  - Heinz Franke
  - Wilhelm Neitzsch
- Fate: Scuttled by her crew at Wesermünde near Bremerhaven on May 3, 1945.
- U-boat.net webpage for U-3509

== U-3510 ==
- Type: XXI
- Construction
  - Laid Down: August 6, 1944
  - Launched: October 4, 1944
  - Commissioned: November 11, 1944
  - Shipyard: Schichau-Werke, Danzig
- Commander
  - Ernst-Werner Schwirley
- Fate: Scuttled in Gelting Bay, May 4, 1945 as part of Operation Regenbogen. Later raised and broken up.
- U-boat.net webpage for U-3510

== U-3511 ==
- Type: XXI
- Construction
  - Laid Down: August 14, 1944
  - Launched: October 11, 1944
  - Commissioned: November 18, 1944
  - Shipyard: Schichau-Werke, Danzig
- Commander
  - Martin Grasse
  - Hans-Heinrich Ketels
  - Hermann Schrenk
- Fate: Scuttled at Travemünde on May 3, 1945, as part of Operation Regenbogen. Later raised and broken up.
- U-boat.net webpage for U-3511

== U-3512 ==
- Type: XXI
- Construction
  - Laid Down: August 15, 1944
  - Launched: October 11, 1944
  - Commissioned: November 27, 1944
  - Shipyard: Schichau-Werke, Danzig
- Commander
  - Hans Hornkohl
- Fate: Destroyed by Royal Air Force bombers whilst laid up empty in Kiel on 9 April 1945. Later raised and broken up.
- U-boat.net webpage for U-3512

== U-3513 ==
- Type: XXI
- Construction
  - Laid Down: August 20, 1944
  - Launched: October 21, 1944
  - Commissioned: December 2, 1944
  - Shipyard: Schichau-Werke, Danzig
- Commander
  - Otto-Heinrich Nachtigall
- Fate: Scuttled at Travemünde on May 3, 1945, as part of Operation Regenbogen. Later raised and broken up.
- U-boat.net webpage for U-3513

== U-3514 ==
- Type: XXI
- Construction
  - Laid Down: August 21, 1944
  - Launched: October 21, 1944
  - Commissioned: December 9, 1944
  - Shipyard: Schichau-Werke, Danzig
- Commander
  - Günther Fritze
- Fate: Surrendered at Bergen on May 9, 1945. Transferred to Lisahally, Northern Ireland, arriving there on June 9. Held at Lisahally until January 1946, when she was taken to Moville. Kept in reserve in case one of the Type XXI submarines transferred to the Soviets did not arrive intact. Ordered to be part of Operation Deadlight on 7 February 1946 and left Moville two days later to be towed to the scuttling area, arriving there on February 12. Sunk by HMS Loch Arkaig with gunfire, "Shark" shells and "Squid" depth charges. U-3514 was the last submarine to be disposed of in Operation Deadlight.
- U-boat.net webpage for U-3514

== U-3515 ==
- Type: XXI
- Construction
  - Laid Down: August 27, 1944
  - Launched: November 4, 1944
  - Commissioned: December 14, 1944
  - Shipyard: Schichau-Werke, Danzig
- Commander
  - Fedor Kuscher
- Fate: Surrendered at Horten, Norway on May 9, 1945. Transferred to Oslo on May 18, to Scapa Flow, Scotland on June 3, arriving there on June 6, and finally to Lisahally, Northern Ireland on June 8, arriving there on June 9. Allocated to the Soviet Union by the TNC. Arrived at Libau (now Liepaja), Latvia on February 2, 1946, as British N-class N30. Allocated to the Soviet Baltic Fleet on February 13, 1946, and renamed N-27 and then to B-27 on June 9, 1949.

Conflicting information exists for the rest of her career: one source states that she was sent to the reserve fleet on December 29, 1955, and redesignated as floating submarine battery charging station PZS-35 on January 18, 1956. Redesignated as test hulk B-100 on July 2, 1958. Struck from the Soviet Navy on September 25, 1959, and scrapped on November 30.

Another source stated that as of March 1951 she was assigned to the 27th Submarine Division, 158th Submarine Brigade and redesignated as test hulk BSh-28 on June 10, 1955, and stationary training submarine UTS-3 on January 9, 1957. Struck from the Soviet Navy on September 1, 1972, and sold for scrap on February 5, 1973.

- U-boat.net webpage for U-3515

== U-3516 ==
- Type: XXI
- Construction
  - Laid Down: Summer 1944
  - Launched: November 4, 1944
  - Commissioned: December 18, 1944
  - Shipyard: Schichau-Werke, Danzig
- Commander
  - Hans Wengel
  - Heinrich Grote
- Fate: Scuttled at Travemünde near Neustadt, May 2, 1945. Later raised and broken up.
- U-boat.net webpage for U-3516

== U-3517 ==
- Type: XXI
- Construction
  - Laid Down: September 12, 1944
  - Launched: December 6, 1944
  - Commissioned: December 22, 1944
  - Shipyard: Schichau-Werke, Danzig
- Commander
  - Helmuth Münster
- Fate: Scuttled at Travemünde near Neustadt, May 4, 1945
- U-boat.net webpage for U-3517

== U-3518 ==
- Type: XXI
- Construction
  - Laid Down: September 12, 1944
  - Launched: December 11, 1944
  - Commissioned: December 29, 1944
  - Shipyard: Schichau-Werke, Danzig
- Commander
  - Herbert Brünning
- Fate: Scuttled in Kiel harbour, May 3, 1945
- U-boat.net webpage for U-3518

== U-3519 ==
- Type: XXI
- Construction
  - Laid Down: September 19, 1944
  - Launched: November 23, 1944
  - Commissioned: January 6, 1945
  - Shipyard: Schichau-Werke, Danzig
- Commander
  - Richard von Harpe
- Fate: Sunk with all hands by an RAF air-dropped mine during training north of Warnemünde on March 2, 1945.
- U-boat.net webpage for U-3519

== U-3520 ==
- Type: XXI
- Construction
  - Laid Down: September 20, 1944
  - Launched: November 23, 1944
  - Commissioned: January 12, 1945
  - Shipyard: Schichau-Werke, Danzig
- Commander
  - Sarto Ballert
- Fate: Sunk with all hands during training northeast of Bülk by mines on January 31, 1945.
- U-boat.net webpage for U-3520

== U-3521 ==
- Type: XXI
- Construction
  - Laid Down: October 3, 1944
  - Launched: December 3, 1944
  - Commissioned: January 14, 1945
  - Shipyard: Schichau-Werke, Danzig
- Commander
  - Günther Keller
- Fate: Scuttled at Travemünde near Neustadt, May 2, 1945
- U-boat.net webpage for U-3521

== U-3522 ==
- Type: XXI
- Construction
  - Laid Down: October 1944
  - Launched: December 3, 1944
  - Commissioned: January 21, 1945
  - Shipyard: Schichau-Werke, Danzig
- Commander
  - Diether Lenzmann
- Fate: Scuttled at Travemünde near Neustadt, May 2, 1945
- U-boat.net webpage for U-3522

== U-3523 ==
- Type: XXI
- Construction
  - Laid Down: October 7, 1944
  - Launched: December 14, 1944
  - Commissioned: January 23, 1945
  - Shipyard: Schichau-Werke, Danzig
- Commander
  - Willi Müller
- Fate: Sunk during training with all hands by depth charges from a B-24 Liberator of RAF 86 Squadron in the Skagerrak northeast of Skagen Horn on May 6, 1945. Wreckage found in April 2018.
- U-boat.net webpage for U-3523

== U-3524 ==
- Type: XXI
- Construction
  - Laid Down: October 1944
  - Launched: December 14, 1944
  - Commissioned: January 26, 1945
  - Shipyard: Schichau-Werke, Danzig
- Commander
  - Hans-Ludwig Witt
- Fate: Scuttled in Flensburger Förde, May 4, 1945
- U-boat.net webpage for U-3524

== U-3525 ==
- Type: XXI
- Construction
  - Laid Down: October 17, 1944
  - Launched: December 23, 1944
  - Commissioned: January 31, 1945
  - Shipyard: Schichau-Werke, Danzig
- Commanders
  - Hans-Ludwig Gaude
  - Franz Kranich
- Fate: Severely damaged by an air raid on Kiel, the wreckage was scuttled on May 3, 1945
- U-boat.net webpage for U-3525

== U-3526 ==
- Type: XXI
- Construction
  - Laid Down: October 15, 1944
  - Launched: December 23, 1944
  - Commissioned: March 22, 1945
  - Shipyard: Schichau-Werke, Danzig
- Commander
  - Kurt Hilbig
- Fate: Scuttled in the mouth of the Weser River at Wesermünde, May 4, 1945
- U-boat.net webpage for U-3526

== U-3527 ==
- Type: XXI
- Construction
  - Laid Down: October 25, 1944
  - Launched: January 10, 1945
  - Commissioned: March 10, 1945
  - Shipyard: Schichau-Werke, Danzig
- Commander
  - Willy Kronenbitter
- Fate: Scuttled in the mouth of the Weser River at Wesermünde, May 4, 1945
- U-boat.net webpage for U-3527

== U-3528 ==
- Type: XXI
- Construction
  - Laid Down: October 26, 1944
  - Launched: January 10, 1945
  - Commissioned: March 18, 1945
  - Shipyard: Schichau-Werke, Danzig
- Commander
  - Heinz Zwarg
- Fate: Scuttled in the mouth of the Weser River at Wesermünde, May 4, 1945. Later raised and broken up.
- U-boat.net webpage for U-3528

== U-3529 ==
- Type: XXI
- Construction
  - Laid Down: November 2, 1944
  - Launched: January 26, 1945
  - Commissioned: March 22, 1945
  - Shipyard: Schichau-Werke, Danzig
- Commander
  - Karl-Heinz Schmidt
- Fate: Scuttled in Flensburger Förde, May 5, 1945. Later raised and broken up.
- U-boat.net webpage for U-3529

== U-3530 ==
- Type: XXI
- Construction
  - Laid Down: November 3, 1944
  - Launched: January 26, 1945
  - Commissioned: March 23, 1945
  - Shipyard: Schichau-Werke, Danzig
- Commanders
  - Wilhelm Brauel
  - Walter-Ernst Koch
- Fate: Scuttled in Kiel harbour, May 3, 1945. Later raised and broken up.
- U-boat.net webpage for U-3530

== U-3531 ==
- Type: XXI
- Construction
  - Laid Down: November 9, 1944
  - Launched: February 3, 1945
  - Commissioned:
  - Shipyard: Schichau-Werke, Danzig
- Commander
- Fate: Nearly finished, towed to Wesermunde and broken up.
- U-boat.net webpage for U-3531

== U-3532 ==
- Type: XXI
- Construction
  - Laid Down: November 9, 1944
  - Launched: February 3, 1945
  - Commissioned:
  - Shipyard: Schichau-Werke, Danzig
- Commander
- Fate: Nearly finished, towed to Wesermunde and broken up.
- U-boat.net webpage for U-3532

== U-3533 ==
- Type: XXI
- Construction
  - Laid Down: November 16, 1944
  - Launched: February 14, 1945
  - Commissioned:
  - Shipyard: Schichau-Werke, Danzig
- Commander
- Fate: Nearly finished, towed to Wesermunde and broken up.
- U-boat.net webpage for U-3533

== U-3534 ==
- Type: XXI
- Construction
  - Laid Down: November 17, 1944
  - Launched: February 14, 1945
  - Commissioned:
  - Shipyard: Schichau-Werke, Danzig
- Commander
- Fate: Nearly finished, towed to Wesermunde and broken up.
- U-boat.net webpage for U-3534

== U-3535 ==
- Type: XXI
- Construction
  - Laid Down: November 26, 1944
  - Launched:
  - Commissioned:
  - Shipyard: Schichau-Werke, Danzig
- Commander
- Fate: Captured incomplete by the Soviets on Slip No. 4 on March 30, 1945, was 95% complete for launching when captured. Redesignated TS-5 on April 12, 1945, and launched at Danzig in July 1945. Allocated to Soviet Baltic Fleet and moved to Libau, Latvia. Inspected by TNC at Libau on October 8, 1945, still incomplete and with a missing rudder. Moved to Kronstadt in early 1945 or early 1946 and probably commissioned into the Soviet Navy for sea trials/training. Renamed R-1 on March 8, 1947. Sunk in the Baltic off Cape Ristna Lighthouse on August 7 or 8, 1947.
- U-boat.net webpage for U-3535

== U-3536 ==
- Type: XXI
- Construction
  - Laid Down: November 27, 1944
  - Launched:
  - Commissioned:
  - Shipyard: Schichau-Werke, Danzig
- Commander
- Fate: Captured incomplete by the Soviets on Slip No. 4 on March 30, 1945, was 95% complete for launching when captured. Redesignated TS-6 on April 12, 1945, and launched at Danzig in July 1945. Allocated to Soviet Baltic Fleet and moved to Libau, Latvia. Inspected by TNC at Libau on October 8, 1945, still incomplete and with a missing rudder. Moved to Kronstadt in early 1945 or early 1946 and probably commissioned into the Soviet Navy for sea trials/training. Renamed R-2 on March 8, 1947. Sunk in the Baltic off Cape Ristna Lighthouse on August 7 or 8, 1947.
- U-boat.net webpage for U-3536

== U-3537 ==
- Type: XXI
- Construction
  - Laid Down: December 20, 1944
  - Launched:
  - Commissioned:
  - Shipyard: Schichau-Werke, Danzig
- Commander
- Fate: Captured incomplete by the Soviets on Slip No. 3 on March 30, 1945. Redesignated TS-7 on April 12, 1945, and launched at Danzig in mid-1945. Allocated to Soviet Baltic Fleet and moved to Libau, Latvia. Inspected by TNC at Libau on October 8, 1945, still incomplete. Moved to Kronstadt in early 1945 or early 1946 and probably commissioned into the Soviet Navy for sea trials/training. Renamed R-3 on March 8, 1947. Sunk in the Baltic off Cape Ristna Lighthouse on August 7 or 8, 1947.
- U-boat.net webpage for U-3537

== U-3538 ==
- Type: XXI
- Construction
  - Laid Down:
  - Launched:
  - Commissioned:
  - Shipyard: Schichau-Werke, Danzig
- Commander
- Fate: Construction suspended on January 29, 1945. Captured incomplete by the Soviets on Slip No. 3 on March 30, 1945. Redesignated TS-8 on April 12, 1945, and launched at Danzig in July 1945. Allocated to Soviet Baltic Fleet and moved to Libau, Latvia. Inspected by TNC at Libau on October 8, 1945, still incomplete with bomb damage and a flooded forward section. Moved to Kronstadt in early 1945 or early 1946. Renamed R-4 on March 8, 1947. Struck off Soviet Navy list on February 28, 1948, and released for recovery, later broken up for scrap.
- U-boat.net webpage for U-3538

== U-3539 ==
- Type: XXI
- Construction
  - Laid Down:
  - Launched:
  - Commissioned:
  - Shipyard: Schichau-Werke, Danzig
- Commander
- Fate: Construction suspended on January 29, 1945. Captured incomplete by the Soviets on Slip No. 2 on March 30, 1945. Redesignated TS-9 on April 12, 1945, and launched at Danzig in July 1945. Allocated to Soviet Baltic Fleet and moved to Libau, Latvia and then to Tallinn, Estonia, still incomplete. Moved to Kronstadt in early 1945 or early 1946. Renamed R-5 on March 8, 1947. Struck off Soviet Navy list on February 29, 1948, and released for recovery, later broken up for scrap.
- U-boat.net webpage for U-3539

== U-3540 ==
- Type: XXI
- Construction
  - Laid Down:
  - Launched:
  - Commissioned:
  - Shipyard: Schichau-Werke, Danzig
- Commander
- Fate: Construction suspended on January 29, 1945. Captured incomplete by the Soviets on Slip No. 2 on March 30, 1945. Redesignated TS-10 on April 12, 1945, and launched at Danzig in July 1945. Allocated to Soviet Baltic Fleet and moved to Libau, Latvia. Inspected by TNC at Libau on October 8, 1945, still incomplete and with a missing rudder. Moved to Kronstadt in early 1945 or early 1946. Renamed R-6 on March 8, 1947. Struck off Soviet Navy list on February 28, 1948, and released for recovery, later broken up for scrap.
- U-boat.net webpage for U-3540

== U-3541 ==
- Type: XXI
- Construction
  - Laid Down:
  - Launched:
  - Commissioned:
  - Shipyard: Schichau-Werke, Danzig
- Commander
- Fate: Construction suspended on January 29, 1945. Captured incomplete by the Soviets on Slip No. 6 on March 30, 1945. Redesignated TS-11 on April 12, 1945, and launched at Danzig in July 1945. Allocated to Soviet Baltic Fleet and moved to Libau, Latvia and then to Tallinn, Estonia, still incomplete. Moved to Kronstadt in early 1945 or early 1946. Renamed R-7 on March 8, 1947. Struck off Soviet Navy list on February 28, 1948, and released for recovery, later broken up for scrap.
- U-boat.net webpage for U-3541

== U-3542 ==
- Type: XXI
- Construction
  - Laid Down:
  - Launched:
  - Commissioned:
  - Shipyard: Schichau-Werke, Danzig
- Commander
- Fate: Construction suspended on January 29, 1945. Captured incomplete by the Soviets on Slip No. 3 on March 30, 1945. Redesignated TS-12 on April 12, 1945, and launched at Danzig in July 1945. Allocated to Soviet Baltic Fleet and moved to Libau, Latvia. Inspected by TNC at Libau on October 8, 1945, still incomplete. Moved to Kronstadt in early 1945 or early 1946. Renamed R-8 on March 8, 1947. Struck off Soviet Navy list on February 28, 1948, and released for recovery, later broken up for scrap.
- U-boat.net webpage for U-3542

== U-3543 ==
- Type: XXI
- Construction
  - Laid Down:
  - Launched:
  - Commissioned:
  - Shipyard: Schichau-Werke, Danzig
- Commander
- Fate: Construction suspended on January 29, 1945. Prefabricated sections captured by the Soviets on March 30, 1945. Redesignated TS-13 on April 12, 1945. Probably never completed. Struck from Soviet Navy on April 9, 1947, and later broken up for scrap.
- U-boat.net webpage for U-3543

== U-3544 ==
- Type: XXI
- Construction
  - Laid Down:
  - Launched:
  - Commissioned:
  - Shipyard: Schichau-Werke, Danzig
- Commander
- Fate: Construction suspended on January 29, 1945. Prefabricated sections captured by the Soviets on March 30, 1945. Redesignated TS-15 on April 12, 1945. Probably never completed. Struck from Soviet Navy on April 9, 1947, and later broken up for scrap.
- U-boat.net webpage for U-3544

== U-3545 ==
- Type: XXI
- Construction
  - Laid Down:
  - Launched:
  - Commissioned:
  - Shipyard: Schichau-Werke, Danzig
- Commander
- Fate: Construction suspended on January 29, 1945. Prefabricated sections captured by the Soviets on March 30, 1945. Redesignated TS-17 on April 12, 1945. Probably never completed. Struck from Soviet Navy on April 9, 1947, and later broken up for scrap.
- U-boat.net webpage for U-3545

== U-3554 ==
- Type: XXI
- Construction
  - Laid Down:
  - Launched:
  - Commissioned:
  - Shipyard: Schichau-Werke, Danzig
- Commander
- Fate: Construction suspended on January 29, 1945. Prefabricated sections captured by the Soviets on March 30, 1945. Redesignated TS-38 on April 12, 1945. Probably never completed. Struck from Soviet Navy on April 9, 1947, and later broken up for scrap.
- U-boat.net webpage for U-3554

== U-3558 ==
- Type: XXI
- Construction
  - Laid Down:
  - Launched:
  - Commissioned:
  - Shipyard: Schichau-Werke, Danzig
- Commander
- Fate: Construction suspended on January 29, 1945. Construction of sections not started.
- U-boat.net webpage for U-3558

== U-4701 ==
- Type: XXIII
- Construction
  - Laid Down: October 19, 1944
  - Launched: December 14, 1944
  - Commissioned: January 10, 1945
  - Shipyard: Germaniawerft, Kiel
- Commander
  - Arnold Wiechmann
- Fate: Served as a training boat in the 5th Flotilla. Scuttled at Hörup Haff on May 5, 1945. Later broken up.
- U-boat.net webpage for U-4701

== U-4706 ==
- Type: XXIII
- Construction
  - Laid Down: November 14, 1944
  - Launched: January 19, 1945
  - Commissioned: February 7, 1945
  - Shipyard: Germaniawerft, Kiel
- Commander
  - Manfred Schneider
- Fate: Served as a training boat in the 5th Flotilla. Surrendered at Kristiansand Süd, Norway on May 9, 1945. Transferred to Norway in October 1948 and became the Norwegian submarine KNM Knerter.
- U-boat.net webpage for U-4706

== U-4708 ==
- Type: XXIII
- Construction
  - Laid Down: December 1, 1944
  - Launched: March 24, 1945
  - Commissioned:
  - Shipyard: Germaniawerft, Kiel
- Commander
- Fate: Sunk just prior to commissioning on April 9, 1945, in the Kilian bunker in Kiel. Rumored to be still there in early 2000.
- U-boat.net webpage for U-4708
