= List of U-boats of Germany =

Germany has commissioned over 1,500 U-boats (German: Unterseeboot) into its various navies from 1906 to the present day. The submarines have usually been designated with a U followed by a number, although World War I coastal submarines and coastal minelaying submarines used the UB and UC prefixes, respectively. When Germany resumed building submarines in the 1930s, the numbering of the submarines was restarted at 1. The renumbering was restarted at 1 a third time when Germany resumed building submarines in the 1960s.

== World War I–era U-boats ==
There were some 380 U-boats commissioned into the Kaiserliche Marine in the years before and during World War I. Although the first four German U-boats—U-1, U-2, U-3, and U-4—were commissioned before 1910, all four served in a training capacity during the war. German U-boats used during World War I were divided into three series. The U designation was generally reserved for ocean-going attack torpedo U-boats. The UB designation was used for coastal attack U-boats, while the UC designation was reserved for coastal minelaying U-boats.

=== U-boats ===
U-boats designed primarily for deep water service were designated with a U prefix and numbered up to 167.

==== Type U 1 ====
- SM U-1

==== Type U 2 ====
- SM U-2

==== Type U 3 ====
- SM U-3
- SM U-4

==== Type U 5 ====
- SM U-5
- SM U-6
- SM U-7
- SM U-8

==== Type U 9 ====
- SM U-9
- SM U-10
- SM U-11
- SM U-12

==== Type U 13 ====
- SM U-13
- SM U-14
- SM U-15

==== Type U 16 ====
- SM U-16

==== Type U 17 ====
- SM U-17
- SM U-18

==== Type U 19 ====
- SM U-19
- SM U-20
- SM U-21
- SM U-22

==== Type U 23 ====
- SM U-23
- SM U-24
- SM U-25
- SM U-26

==== Type U 27 ====
- SM U-27
- SM U-28
- SM U-29
- SM U-30

==== Type U 31 ====
- SM U-31
- SM U-32
- SM U-33
- SM U-34
- SM U-35
- SM U-36
- SM U-37
- SM U-38
- SM U-39
- SM U-40
- SM U-41

==== Type U 43 ====
- SM U-43
- SM U-44
- SM U-45
- SM U-46
- SM U-47
- SM U-48
- SM U-49
- SM U-50

==== Type U 51 ====
- SM U-51
- SM U-52
- SM U-53
- SM U-54
- SM U-55
- SM U-56

==== Type U 57 ====
- SM U-57
- SM U-58
- SM U-59
- SM U-60
- SM U-61
- SM U-62
- SM U-99
- SM U-100
- SM U-101
- SM U-102
- SM U-103
- SM U-104

==== Type U 63 ====
- SM U-63
- SM U-64
- SM U-65

==== Type U 66 (Type UD) ====
The Type U 66 submarines were originally constructed for Austro-Hungary as the U-7 class, but were sold to Germany at the start of WWI.

- SM U-66
- SM U-67
- SM U-68
- SM U-69
- SM U-70

==== Type UE I (Type U 71) ====
- SM U-71
- SM U-72
- SM U-73
- SM U-74
- SM U-75
- SM U-76
- SM U-77
- SM U-78
- SM U-79
- SM U-80

==== Type U 81 ====
- SM U-81
- SM U-82
- SM U-83
- SM U-84
- SM U-85
- SM U-86

==== Type U 87 ====
- SM U-87
- SM U-88
- SM U-89
- SM U-90
- SM U-91
- SM U-92

==== Type U 93 ====
- SM U-93
- SM U-94
- SM U-95
- SM U-96
- SM U-97
- SM U-98
- SM U-105
- SM U-106
- SM U-107
- SM U-108
- SM U-109
- SM U-110
- SM U-111
- SM U-112
- SM U-113
- SM U-114
- SM U-160
- SM U-161
- SM U-162
- SM U-163
- SM U-164
- SM U-165
- SM U-166
- SM U-167

==== Type U 115 ====
- SM U-115
- SM U-116

==== Type UE II (Type U 117) ====
- SM U-117
- SM U-118
- SM U-119
- SM U-120
- SM U-121
- SM U-122
- SM U-123
- SM U-124
- SM U-125
- SM U-126

==== Type U 127 ====
- SM U-127
- SM U-128
- SM U-129
- SM U-130
- SM U-131
- SM U-132
- SM U-133
- SM U-134

==== Type Large MS (Type U 135) ====
- SM U-135
- SM U-136
- SM U-137
- SM U-138

==== Type U 139 ====
- SM U-139
- SM U-140
- SM U-141

==== Type U 142 ====
- SM U-142
- SM U-143
- SM U-144
- SM U-145
- SM U-146
- SM U-147
- SM U-148
- SM U-149
- SM U-150

==== Type U 151 (Deutschland-class submarine) ====
- SM U-151
- SM U-152
- SM U-153
- SM U-154
- SM U-155
- SM U-156
- SM U-157

==== Type U 158 ====
- SM U-158
- SM U-159

=== UB coastal U-boats ===
Coastal attack torpedo U-boats were smaller craft intended for operation closer to land. They were designated with a UB prefix and numbered up to 155.

==== Type UB I ====
- UB-1
- UB-2
- UB-3
- UB-4
- UB-5
- UB-6
- UB-7
- UB-8
- UB-9
- UB-10
- UB-11
- UB-12
- UB-13
- UB-14
- UB-15
- UB-16
- UB-17

==== Type UB II ====
- UB-18
- UB-19
- UB-20
- UB-21
- UB-22
- UB-23
- UB-24
- UB-25
- UB-26
- UB-27
- UB-28
- UB-29
- UB-30
- UB-31
- UB-32
- UB-33
- UB-34
- UB-35
- UB-36
- UB-37
- UB-38
- UB-39
- UB-40
- UB-41
- UB-42
- UB-43
- UB-44
- UB-45
- UB-46
- UB-47

==== Type UB III ====
- UB-48
- UB-49
- UB-50
- UB-51
- UB-52
- UB-53
- UB-54
- UB-55
- UB-56
- UB-57
- UB-58
- UB-59
- UB-60
- UB-61
- UB-62
- UB-63
- UB-64
- UB-65
- UB-66
- UB-67
- UB-68
- UB-69
- UB-70
- UB-71
- UB-72
- UB-73
- UB-74
- UB-75
- UB-76
- UB-77
- UB-78
- UB-79
- UB-80
- UB-81
- UB-82
- UB-83
- UB-84
- UB-85
- UB-86
- UB-87
- UB-88
- UB-89
- UB-90
- UB-91
- UB-92
- UB-93
- UB-94
- UB-95
- UB-96
- UB-97
- UB-98
- UB-99
- UB-100
- UB-101
- UB-102
- UB-103
- UB-104
- UB-105
- UB-106
- UB-107
- UB-108
- UB-109
- UB-110
- UB-111
- UB-112
- UB-113
- UB-114
- UB-115
- UB-116
- UB-117
- UB-118
- UB-119
- UB-120
- UB-121
- UB-122
- UB-123
- UB-124
- UB-125
- UB-126
- UB-127
- UB-128
- UB-129
- UB-130
- UB-131
- UB-132
- UB-133
- UB-134
- UB-135
- UB-136
- UB-137
- UB-138
- UB-139
- UB-140
- UB-141
- UB-142
- UB-143
- UB-144
- UB-145
- UB-146
- UB-147
- UB-148
- UB-149
- UB-150
- UB-151
- UB-152
- UB-153
- UB-154
- UB-155

=== UC coastal minelaying U-boats ===
Coastal minelaying U-boats were smaller vessels intended to mine enemy harbors and approaches. They were designated with a UC prefix and numbered up to 114.

==== Type UC I ====
- UC-1
- UC-2
- UC-3
- UC-4
- UC-5
- UC-6
- UC-7
- UC-8
- UC-9
- UC-10
- UC-11
- UC-12
- UC-13
- UC-14
- UC-15

==== Type UC II ====
- UC-16
- UC-17
- UC-18
- UC-19
- UC-20
- UC-21
- UC-22
- UC-23
- UC-24
- UC-25
- UC-26
- UC-27
- UC-28
- UC-29
- UC-30
- UC-31
- UC-32
- UC-33
- UC-34
- UC-35
- UC-36
- UC-37
- UC-38
- UC-39
- UC-40
- UC-41
- UC-42
- UC-43
- UC-44
- UC-45
- UC-46
- UC-47
- UC-48
- UC-49
- UC-50
- UC-51
- UC-52
- UC-53
- UC-54
- UC-55
- UC-56
- UC-57
- UC-58
- UC-59
- UC-60
- UC-61
- UC-62
- UC-63
- UC-64
- UC-65
- UC-66
- UC-67
- UC-68
- UC-69
- UC-70
- UC-71
- UC-72
- UC-73
- UC-74
- UC-75
- UC-76
- UC-77
- UC-78
- UC-79

==== Type UC III ====
Thirty-five Type UC III submarines were planned, but only 25 were completed. Nine of these (UC-106 to UC-114) were never commissioned and were awarded to the United Kingdom and France and broken up in 1921. Ten of these (UC-80 to UC-89) were broken up at yard

- UC-80
- UC-81
- UC-82
- UC-83
- UC-84
- UC-85
- UC-86
- UC-87
- UC-88
- UC-89
- UC-90
- UC-91
- UC-92
- UC-93
- UC-94
- UC-95
- UC-96
- UC-97
- UC-98
- UC-99
- UC-100
- UC-101
- UC-102
- UC-103
- UC-104
- UC-105
- UC-106
- UC-107
- UC-108
- UC-109
- UC-110
- UC-111
- UC-112
- UC-113
- UC-114

=== Foreign U-boats ===
At the outbreak of World War I Germany took charge of a number of submarines under construction in German shipyards for other countries.

- SM UA (ex-Norwegian A-class submarine A-5)
- U-66 to U-70 (ex-Austro-Hungarian U-7 class U-7 to U-11)
- US-1 (ex-Russian Bars class Burevestnik), only test run - not in service
- US-2 (ex-Russian Bars class Orlan), Commissioned later abandoned to White Russian Forces
- US-3 (ex-Russian Bars class Utka), only test run - not in service
- US-4 (ex-Russian Bars class Gagara), only test run - not in service

== World War II U-boats ==
In the World War II era, Germany commissioned some 1,250 U-boats into the Kriegsmarine.

=== Type I ===
- U-25
- U-26

=== Type II ===
==== Type IIA ====
- U-1
- U-2
- U-3
- U-4
- U-5
- U-6

==== Type IIB ====
- U-7
- U-8
- U-9
- U-10
- U-11
- U-12
- U-13
- U-14
- U-15
- U-16
- U-17
- U-18
- U-19
- U-20
- U-21
- U-22
- U-23
- U-24
- U-120
- U-121

==== Type IIC ====
- U-56
- U-57
- U-58
- U-59
- U-60
- U-61
- U-62
- U-63

==== Type IID ====
- U-137
- U-138
- U-139
- U-140
- U-141
- U-142
- U-143
- U-144
- U-145
- U-146
- U-147
- U-148
- U-149
- U-150
- U-151
- U-152

=== Type VII ===
==== Type VIIA ====
- U-27
- U-28
- U-29
- U-30
- U-31
- U-32
- U-33
- U-34
- U-35
- U-36

==== Type VIIB ====
- U-45
- U-46
- U-47
- U-48
- U-49
- U-50
- U-51
- U-52
- U-53
- U-54
- U-55
- U-73
- U-74
- U-75
- U-76
- U-83
- U-84
- U-85
- U-86
- U-87
- U-99
- U-100
- U-101
- U-102

==== Type VIIC ====
- U-69
- U-70
- U-71
- U-72
- U-77
- U-78
- U-79
- U-80
- U-81
- U-82
- U-88
- U-89
- U-90
- U-91
- U-92
- U-93
- U-94
- U-95
- U-96
- U-97
- U-98
- U-132
- U-133
- U-134
- U-135
- U-136
- U-201
- U-202
- U-203
- U-204
- U-205
- U-206
- U-207
- U-208
- U-209
- U-210
- U-211
- U-212
- U-221
- U-222
- U-223
- U-224
- U-225
- U-226
- U-227
- U-228
- U-229
- U-230
- U-231
- U-232
- U-235
- U-236
- U-237
- U-238
- U-239
- U-240
- U-241
- U-242
- U-243
- U-244
- U-245
- U-246
- U-247
- U-248
- U-249
- U-250
- U-251
- U-252
- U-253
- U-254
- U-255
- U-256
- U-257
- U-258
- U-259
- U-260
- U-261
- U-262
- U-263
- U-264
- U-265
- U-266
- U-267
- U-268
- U-269
- U-270
- U-271
- U-272
- U-273
- U-274
- U-275
- U-276
- U-277
- U-278
- U-279
- U-280
- U-281
- U-282
- U-283
- U-284
- U-285
- U-286
- U-287
- U-288
- U-289
- U-290
- U-291
- U-301
- U-302
- U-303
- U-304
- U-305
- U-306
- U-307
- U-308
- U-309
- U-310
- U-311
- U-312
- U-313
- U-314
- U-315
- U-316
- U-331
- U-332
- U-333
- U-334
- U-335
- U-336
- U-337
- U-338
- U-339
- U-340
- U-341
- U-342
- U-343
- U-344
- U-345
- U-346
- U-347
- U-348
- U-349
- U-350
- U-351
- U-352
- U-353
- U-354
- U-355
- U-356
- U-357
- U-358
- U-359
- U-360
- U-361
- U-362
- U-363
- U-364
- U-365
- U-366
- U-367
- U-368
- U-369
- U-370
- U-371
- U-372
- U-373
- U-374
- U-375
- U-376
- U-377
- U-378
- U-379
- U-380
- U-381
- U-382
- U-383
- U-384
- U-385
- U-386
- U-387
- U-388
- U-389
- U-390
- U-391
- U-392
- U-393
- U-394
- U-395
- U-396
- U-397
- U-398
- U-399
- U-400
- U-401
- U-402
- U-403
- U-404
- U-405
- U-406
- U-407
- U-408
- U-409
- U-410
- U-411
- U-412
- U-413
- U-414
- U-415
- U-416
- U-417
- U-418
- U-419
- U-420
- U-421
- U-422
- U-423
- U-424
- U-425
- U-426
- U-427
- U-428
- U-429
- U-430
- U-431
- U-432
- U-433
- U-434
- U-435
- U-436
- U-437
- U-438
- U-439
- U-440
- U-441
- U-442
- U-443
- U-444
- U-445
- U-446
- U-447
- U-448
- U-449
- U-450
- U-451
- U-452
- U-453
- U-454
- U-455
- U-456
- U-457
- U-458
- U-465
- U-466
- U-467
- U-468
- U-469
- U-470
- U-471
- U-472
- U-473
- U-474
- U-475
- U-476
- U-477
- U-478
- U-479
- U-480
- U-481
- U-482
- U-483
- U-484
- U-485
- U-486
- U-551
- U-552
- U-553
- U-554
- U-555
- U-556
- U-557
- U-558
- U-559
- U-560
- U-561
- U-562
- U-563
- U-564
- U-565
- U-566
- U-567
- U-568
- U-569
- U-570
- U-571
- U-572
- U-573
- U-574
- U-575
- U-576
- U-577
- U-578
- U-579
- U-580
- U-581
- U-582
- U-583
- U-584
- U-585
- U-586
- U-587
- U-588
- U-589
- U-590
- U-591
- U-592
- U-593
- U-594
- U-595
- U-596
- U-597
- U-598
- U-599
- U-600
- U-601
- U-602
- U-603
- U-604
- U-605
- U-606
- U-607
- U-608
- U-609
- U-610
- U-611
- U-612
- U-613
- U-614
- U-615
- U-616
- U-617
- U-618
- U-619
- U-620
- U-621
- U-622
- U-623
- U-624
- U-625
- U-626
- U-627
- U-628
- U-629
- U-630
- U-631
- U-632
- U-633
- U-634
- U-635
- U-636
- U-637
- U-638
- U-639
- U-640
- U-641
- U-642
- U-643
- U-644
- U-645
- U-646
- U-647
- U-648
- U-649
- U-650
- U-651
- U-652
- U-653
- U-654
- U-655
- U-656
- U-657
- U-658
- U-659
- U-660
- U-661
- U-662
- U-663
- U-664
- U-665
- U-666
- U-667
- U-668
- U-669
- U-670
- U-671
- U-672
- U-673
- U-674
- U-675
- U-676
- U-677
- U-678
- U-679
- U-680
- U-681
- U-682
- U-683
- U-684
- U-685
- U-686
- U-701
- U-702
- U-703
- U-704
- U-705
- U-706
- U-707
- U-708
- U-709
- U-710
- U-711
- U-712
- U-713
- U-714
- U-715
- U-716
- U-717
- U-718
- U-719
- U-720
- U-721
- U-722
- U-731
- U-732
- U-733
- U-734
- U-735
- U-736
- U-737
- U-738
- U-739
- U-740
- U-741
- U-742
- U-743
- U-744
- U-745
- U-746
- U-747
- U-748
- U-749
- U-750
- U-751
- U-752
- U-753
- U-754
- U-755
- U-756
- U-757
- U-758
- U-759
- U-760
- U-761
- U-762
- U-763
- U-764
- U-765
- U-766
- U-767
- U-768
- U-771
- U-772
- U-773
- U-774
- U-775
- U-776
- U-777
- U-778
- U-779
- U-780
- U-781
- U-782
- U-821
- U-822
- U-823
- U-824
- U-825
- U-826
- U-901
- U-902
- U-903
- U-904
- U-905
- U-906
- U-907
- U-908
- U-921
- U-922
- U-923
- U-924
- U-925
- U-926
- U-927
- U-928
- U-951
- U-952
- U-953
- U-954
- U-955
- U-956
- U-957
- U-958
- U-959
- U-960
- U-961
- U-962
- U-963
- U-964
- U-965
- U-966
- U-967
- U-968
- U-969
- U-970
- U-971
- U-972
- U-973
- U-974
- U-975
- U-976
- U-977
- U-978
- U-979
- U-980
- U-981
- U-982
- U-983
- U-984
- U-985
- U-986
- U-987
- U-988
- U-989
- U-990
- U-991
- U-992
- U-993
- U-994
- U-1051
- U-1052
- U-1053
- U-1054
- U-1055
- U-1056
- U-1057
- U-1058
- U-1101
- U-1102
- U-1131
- U-1132
- U-1161
- U-1162
- U-1191
- U-1192
- U-1193
- U-1194
- U-1195
- U-1196
- U-1197
- U-1198
- U-1199
- U-1200
- U-1201
- U-1202
- U-1203
- U-1204
- U-1205
- U-1206
- U-1207
- U-1208
- U-1209
- U-1210

==== Type VIIC/41 ====
- U-292
- U-293
- U-294
- U-295
- U-296
- U-297
- U-298
- U-299
- U-300
- U-317
- U-318
- U-319
- U-320
- U-321
- U-322
- U-323
- U-324
- U-325
- U-326
- U-327
- U-328
- U-329
- U-330
- U-687
- U-688
- U-689
- U-691
- U-723
- U-724
- U-827
- U-828
- U-929
- U-930
- U-931
- U-932
- U-995
- U-996
- U-997
- U-998
- U-999
- U-1000
- U-1001
- U-1002
- U-1003
- U-1004
- U-1005
- U-1006
- U-1007
- U-1008
- U-1009
- U-1010
- U-1011
- U-1012
- U-1013
- U-1014
- U-1015
- U-1016
- U-1017
- U-1018
- U-1019
- U-1020
- U-1021
- U-1022
- U-1023
- U-1024
- U-1025
- U-1026
- U-1027
- U-1028
- U-1029
- U-1030
- U-1031
- U-1032
- U-1063
- U-1064
- U-1065
- U-1103
- U-1104
- U-1105
- U-1106
- U-1107
- U-1108
- U-1109
- U-1110
- U-1133
- U-1134
- U-1135
- U-1136
- U-1163
- U-1164
- U-1165
- U-1166
- U-1167
- U-1168
- U-1169
- U-1170
- U-1171
- U-1172
- U-1173
- U-1174
- U-1175
- U-1176
- U-1177
- U-1178
- U-1179
- U-1271
- U-1272
- U-1273
- U-1274
- U-1275
- U-1276
- U-1277
- U-1278
- U-1279
- U-1280
- U-1281
- U-1282
- U-1301
- U-1302
- U-1303
- U-1304
- U-1305
- U-1306
- U-1307
- U-1308

==== Type VIID ====
- U-213
- U-214
- U-215
- U-216
- U-217
- U-218

==== Type VIIF ====
- U-1059
- U-1060
- U-1061
- U-1062

=== Type IX ===
==== Type IXA ====
- U-37
- U-38
- U-39
- U-40
- U-41
- U-42
- U-43
- U-44

==== Type IXB ====
- U-64
- U-65
- U-103
- U-104
- U-105
- U-106
- U-107
- U-108
- U-109
- U-110
- U-111
- U-122
- U-123
- U-124

==== Type IXC ====
- U-66
- U-67
- U-68
- U-125
- U-126
- U-127
- U-128
- U-129
- U-130
- U-131
- U-153
- U-154
- U-155
- U-156
- U-157
- U-158
- U-159
- U-160
- U-161
- U-162
- U-163
- U-164
- U-165
- U-166
- U-171
- U-172
- U-173
- U-174
- U-175
- U-176
- U-501
- U-502
- U-503
- U-504
- U-505
- U-506
- U-507
- U-508
- U-509
- U-510
- U-511
- U-512
- U-513
- U-514
- U-515
- U-516
- U-517
- U-518
- U-519
- U-520
- U-521
- U-522
- U-523
- U-524

==== Type IXC/40 ====
- U-167
- U-168
- U-169
- U-170
- U-183
- U-184
- U-185
- U-186
- U-187
- U-188
- U-189
- U-190
- U-191
- U-192
- U-193
- U-194
- U-525
- U-526
- U-527
- U-528
- U-529
- U-530
- U-531
- U-532
- U-533
- U-534
- U-535
- U-536
- U-537
- U-538
- U-539
- U-540
- U-541
- U-542
- U-543
- U-544
- U-545
- U-546
- U-547
- U-548
- U-549
- U-550
- U-801
- U-802
- U-803
- U-804
- U-805
- U-806
- U-807
- U-808
- U-841
- U-842
- U-843
- U-844
- U-845
- U-846
- U-853
- U-854
- U-855
- U-856
- U-857
- U-858
- U-865
- U-866
- U-867
- U-868
- U-869
- U-870
- U-877
- U-878
- U-879
- U-880
- U-881
- U-882
- U-889
- U-890
- U-891
- U-892
- U-1221
- U-1222
- U-1223
- U-1224
- U-1225
- U-1226
- U-1227
- U-1228
- U-1229
- U-1230
- U-1231
- U-1232
- U-1233
- U-1234
- U-1235

==== Type IXD ====
- U-177
- U-178
- U-179
- U-180
- U-181
- U-182
- U-195
- U-196
- U-197
- U-198
- U-199
- U-200
- U-847
- U-848
- U-849
- U-850
- U-851
- U-852
- U-859
- U-860
- U-861
- U-862
- U-863
- U-864
- U-871
- U-872
- U-873
- U-874
- U-875
- U-876
- U-883
- U-884

=== Type X (XB) ===
Originally intended as long-range minelayers, the Type X were later used as long-range cargo transports.

- U-116
- U-117
- U-118
- U-119
- U-219
- U-220
- U-233
- U-234

=== Type XI ===
The Type XI was a planned artillery boat, armed with four 128-mm guns in two twin turrets along with an Arado Ar 231 floatplane. Four boats were laid down in 1939 but were cancelled at the outbreak of WWII.

- U-112
- U-113
- U-114
- U-115

=== Type XIV ===
The Type XIV submarine was a shortened version of the Type IXD and used as tankers. Twenty-four were planned, but only 10 were commissioned; three (U-491 to U-494) were cancelled before completed and eleven were never laid down. This type was nicknamed Milchkuh (milk cow).

- U-459
- U-460
- U-461
- U-462
- U-463
- U-464
- U-487
- U-488
- U-489
- U-490
- U-491
- U-492
- U-493
- U-494
- U-495
- U-496
- U-497

=== Type XVII ===
==== Type XVIIA ====
- U-792
- U-793
- U-794
- U-795

==== Type XVIIB ====
Twelve Type XVIIB submarines were planned, but only three were completed; three were cancelled at the end of the war before completion and six were cancelled in favor of the Type XXI submarine.

- U-1405
- U-1406
- U-1407

==== Type XVIIK ====
- U-798

=== Type XVIII ===
The Type XVIII was a projected attack boat using the Walter propulsion system. Two boats were laid down in 1943, but construction was cancelled in March 1944.

- U-796
- U-797

=== Type XXI ===
- U-2501
- U-2502
- U-2503
- U-2504
- U-2505
- U-2506
- U-2507
- U-2508
- U-2509
- U-2510
- U-2511
- U-2512
- U-2513
- U-2514
- U-2515
- U-2516
- U-2517
- U-2518
- U-2519
- U-2520
- U-2521
- U-2522
- U-2523
- U-2524
- U-2525
- U-2526
- U-2527
- U-2528
- U-2529
- U-2530
- U-2531
- U-2533
- U-2534
- U-2535
- U-2536
- U-2538
- U-2539
- U-2540
- U-2541
- U-2542
- U-2543
- U-2544
- U-2545
- U-2546
- U-2548
- U-2551
- U-2552
- U-3001
- U-3002
- U-3003
- U-3004
- U-3005
- U-3006
- U-3007
- U-3008
- U-3009
- U-3010
- U-3011
- U-3012
- U-3013
- U-3014
- U-3015
- U-3016
- U-3017
- U-3018
- U-3019
- U-3020
- U-3021
- U-3022
- U-3023
- U-3024
- U-3025
- U-3026
- U-3027
- U-3028
- U-3029
- U-3030
- U-3031
- U-3032
- U-3033
- U-3034
- U-3035
- U-3037
- U-3038
- U-3039
- U-3040
- U-3041
- U-3044
- U-3501
- U-3502
- U-3503
- U-3504
- U-3505
- U-3506
- U-3507
- U-3508
- U-3509
- U-3510
- U-3511
- U-3512
- U-3513
- U-3514
- U-3515
- U-3516
- U-3517
- U-3518
- U-3519
- U-3520
- U-3521
- U-3522
- U-3523
- U-3524
- U-3525
- U-3526
- U-3527
- U-3528
- U-3529
- U-3530

=== Type XXIII ===
- U-2321
- U-2322
- U-2323
- U-2324
- U-2325
- U-2326
- U-2327
- U-2328
- U-2329
- U-2330
- U-2331
- U-2332
- U-2333
- U-2334
- U-2335
- U-2336
- U-2337
- U-2338
- U-2339
- U-2340
- U-2341
- U-2342
- U-2343
- U-2344
- U-2345
- U-2346
- U-2347
- U-2348
- U-2349
- U-2350
- U-2351
- U-2352
- U-2353
- U-2354
- U-2355
- U-2356
- U-2357
- U-2358
- U-2359
- U-2360
- U-2361
- U-2362
- U-2363
- U-2364
- U-2365
- U-2366
- U-2367
- U-2368
- U-2369
- U-2371
- U-4701
- U-4702
- U-4703
- U-4704
- U-4705
- U-4706
- U-4707
- U-4709
- U-4710
- U-4711
- U-4712

=== Midget submarines ===
==== Seehund (Type XVIIB) ====
The range of U-5000 to U-6442 was specifically allocated to German midget submarines. The following Seehund Type XXVIIB U-boats were entered into the Kriegsmarine registry as commissioned vessels

- U-5001
- U-5002
- U-5003
- U-5004
- U-5005
- U-5006
- U-5007
- U-5008
- U-5009
- U-5010
- U-5011
- U-5012
- U-5013
- U-5014
- U-5015
- U-5016
- U-5017
- U-5018
- U-5019
- U-5020
- U-5021
- U-5022
- U-5023
- U-5024
- U-5025
- U-5026
- U-5027
- U-5028
- U-5029
- U-5030
- U-5031
- U-5032
- U-5033
- U-5034
- U-5035
- U-5036
- U-5037
- U-5038
- U-5039
- U-5040
- U-5041
- U-5042
- U-5043
- U-5044
- U-5045
- U-5046
- U-5047
- U-5048
- U-5049
- U-5050
- U-5051
- U-5052
- U-5053
- U-5054
- U-5055
- U-5056
- U-5057
- U-5058
- U-5059
- U-5060
- U-5061
- U-5062
- U-5063
- U-5064
- U-5065
- U-5066
- U-5067
- U-5068
- U-5069
- U-5070
- U-5071
- U-5072
- U-5073
- U-5074
- U-5075
- U-5076
- U-5077
- U-5078
- U-5079
- U-5080
- U-5081
- U-5082
- U-5083
- U-5084
- U-5085
- U-5086
- U-5087
- U-5088
- U-5089
- U-5090
- U-5091
- U-5092
- U-5093
- U-5094
- U-5095
- U-5096
- U-5097
- U-5098
- U-5099
- U-5100
- U-5101
- U-5102
- U-5103
- U-5104
- U-5105
- U-5106
- U-5107
- U-5108
- U-5109
- U-5110
- U-5111
- U-5112
- U-5113
- U-5114
- U-5115
- U-5116
- U-5117
- U-5118
- U-5251
- U-5252
- U-5253
- U-5254
- U-5255
- U-5256
- U-5257
- U-5258
- U-5259
- U-5260
- U-5261
- U-5262
- U-5263
- U-5264
- U-5265
- U-5266
- U-5267
- U-5268
- U-5269
- U-5330

=== Foreign U-boats ===
Germany captured and commissioned 14 submarines from six countries into the Kriegsmarine during World War II.

Turkey

- UA

United Kingdom

- UB

Norway

- UC-1
- UC-2

Netherlands

- UD-1
- UD-2
- UD-3
- UD-4
- UD-5

France

- UF-1
- UF-2
- UF-3

Italy

- UIT-22
- UIT-23
- UIT-24
- UIT-25

== Post–World War II U-boats ==
=== Type XXI ===
- Wilhelm Bauer (ex U-2540)

=== Type XXIII ===
- Hai (ex U-2365)
- Hecht (ex U-2367)

=== Type 201 ===
- U-1 (S180)
- U-2 (S181)
- U-3 (S182)

=== Type 202 ===
- Hans Techel (S172)
- Friedrich Schürer (S173)

=== Type 203 ===
The Type 203 was a planned electric midget hunter-submarine similar to the Type 202 submarine. Unlike the Type 202, it was to use a Walter propulsion system. However, it lacked the ability to recharge its batteries. Cancelled due to high cost and failures of the Type 202.

=== Type 204 ===
The Type 204 was an unrealized submarine class (similar to the Type 206) with Walter propulsion.

=== Type 205 ===
- U-1 (S180)
- U-2 (S181)
- U-4 (S183)
- U-5 (S184)
- U-6 (S185)
- U-7 (S186)
- U-8 (S187)
- U-9 (S188)
- U-10 (S189)
- U-11 (S190)
- U-12 (S191)

=== Type 206 ===
- U-13 (S192)
- U-14 (S193)
- U-15 (S194)
- U-16 (S195)
- U-17 (S196)
- U-18 (S197)
- U-19 (S198)
- U-20 (S199)
- U-21 (S170)
- U-22 (S171)
- U-23 (S172)
- U-24 (S173)
- U-25 (S174)
- U-26 (S175)
- U-27 (S176)
- U-28 (S177)
- U-29 (S178)
- U-30 (S179)

=== Type 208 ===
The Type 208 was an unrealized hunter-submarine design with Walter propulsion for North Sea operations. Planned as a supplement to the Type 206.

=== Type 211 ===
The Type 211 (also known as TR1600) was planned in the mid-1980s as a replacement for the Type 206. Cancelled in 1987 as it was financially impossible to continue development in parallel with the Type 123 frigate. Elements of the Type 211 project would end up in the Type 212A submarine.

=== Type 212A ===
- U-31 (S181)
- U-32 (S182)
- U-33 (S183)
- U-34 (S184)
- U-35 (S185)
- U-36 (S186)

== See also ==
- List of U-boats never deployed
- List of naval ships of Germany
- List of ships of the Second World War
- List of submarines of the Second World War
