= German submarine U-104 =

U-104 may refer to one of the following German submarines:

- SM U-104, a Type U 57 submarine launched in 1917 and that served in the First World War until sunk on 25 April 1918
  - During the First World War, Germany also had these submarines with similar names:
    - SM UB-104, a Type UB III submarine launched in 1917 and that disappeared in September 1918
    - SM UC-104, a Type UC III submarine launched in 1918 and surrendered on 24 November 1918; broken up at Brest in July 1921
- German submarine U-104 (1940), a Type IXB submarine that served in the Second World War until she went missing after 28 November 1940
