= German submarine U-95 =

U-95 may refer to one of the following German submarines:

- SM U-95, a Type U 93 submarine launched in 1917 and that served in the First World War until sunk on 16 January 1918
  - During the First World War, Germany also had these submarines with similar names:
    - SM UB-95, a Type UB III submarine launched in 1918 and surrendered on 21 November 1918; broken up at La Spezia in May 1919
    - SM UC-95, a Type UC III submarine launched in 1918 and surrendered on 22 November 1918; broken up at Fareham in 1921
- German submarine U-95 (1940), a Type VIIC submarine that served in the Second World War until sunk on 28 November 1941
