= German submarine U-90 =

U-90 may refer to one of the following German submarines:

- SM U-90, a Type U 87 submarine launched in 1917 and that served in the First World War until surrendered on 20 November 1918; foundered in tow to Belgium November 1919
  - During the First World War, Germany also had these submarines with similar names:
    - SM UB-90, a Type UB III submarine launched in 1918 and sunk on 16 October 1918
    - SM UC-90, a Type UC III submarine launched in 1918 and surrendered on 1 December 1918; served as Japanese submarine O-4, 1920–21; broken up at the Kure Naval Arsenal in 1921; used as target at submarine school at Kure, 1924–26; sold for scrap
- German submarine U-90 (1941), a Type VIIC submarine that served in the Second World War until sunk on 24 July 1942
