= German submarine U-93 =

U-93 may refer to one of the following German submarines:

- SM U-93, a Type U 93 submarine launched in 1916 and that served in the First World War until it went missing after 15 January 1918
  - During the First World War, Germany also had these submarines with similar names:
    - SM UB-93, a Type UB III submarine launched in 1918 and surrendered on 21 November 1918; broken up at Rochester in 1922
    - SM UC-93, a Type UC III submarine launched in 1918 and surrendered on 26 November 1918; broken up at La Spezia in August 1919
- German submarine U-93 (1940), a Type VIIC submarine that served in the Second World War until sunk on 15 January 1942
