= German submarine U-98 =

U-98 may refer to one of the following German submarines:

- SM U-98, a Type U 93 submarine launched in 1917 and that served in the First World War until surrendered on 16 January 1919; broken up at Blyth in 1922
  - During the First World War, Germany also had these submarines with similar names:
    - SM UB-98, a Type UB III submarine launched in 1918 and surrendered on 21 November 1918; broken up at Parmadoc in 1922
    - SM UC-98, a Type UC III submarine launched in 1918 and surrendered on 24 November 1918; broken up at La Spezia in April 1919
- German submarine U-98 (1940), a Type VIIC submarine that served in the Second World War until sunk on 15 November 1942
