= SM UC-106 =

German Type UC III submarine

History

German Empire
- Name: UC-106
- Builder: Blohm & Voss, Hamburg
- Yard number: 340
- Launched: 25 May 1918
- Completed: 11 November 1918
- Fate: Ceded to UK as war reparation; broken up, 1921

General characteristics
- Class & type: Type UC III submarine
- Displacement: 491 t (483 long tons), surfaced; 571 t (562 long tons), submerged
- Length: 56.51 m (185 ft 5 in) (o/a); 42.20 m (138 ft 5 in) (pressure hull)
- Beam: 5.54 m (18 ft 2 in) (o/a)
- Draft: 3.77 m (12 ft 4 in)
- Propulsion: 2 × propeller shafts; 2 × 6-cylinder, 4-stroke diesel engines, 600 PS (440 kW; 590 bhp); 2 × electric motors, 770 PS (570 kW; 760 shp)
- Speed: 11.5 knots (21.3 km/h; 13.2 mph), surfaced; 6.6 knots (12.2 km/h; 7.6 mph), submerged
- Range: 9,850 nautical miles (18,240 km; 11,340 mi) at 7 knots (13 km/h; 8.1 mph), surfaced; 40 nmi (74 km; 46 mi) at 4.5 knots (8.3 km/h; 5.2 mph), submerged
- Test depth: 75 m (246 ft)
- Complement: 32
- Armament: 6 × 100 cm (39.4 in) mine tubes; 14 × UC 200 mines; 3 × 50 cm (19.7 in) torpedo tubes (2 bow external; one stern); 7 × torpedoes; 1 x 10.5 cm (4.1 in) SK L/45 or 8.8 cm (3.5 in) Uk L/30 deck gun
- Notes: 15-second diving time

SM UC-106 was a German Type UC III minelaying submarine or U-boat built for the German Imperial Navy (German: Kaiserliche Marine) during World War I.

== Design ==
A Type UC III submarine, UC-106 had a displacement of 491 tonnes (483 long tons) when at the surface and 571 tonnes (562 long tons) while submerged. She had a length overall of 56.51 m (185 ft 5 in), a beam of 5.54 m (18 ft 2 in), and a draught of 3.77 m (12 ft 4 in). The submarine was powered by two six-cylinder four-stroke diesel engines each producing 300 metric horsepower (220 kW; 300 shp) (a total of 600 metric horsepower (440 kW; 590 shp)), two electric motors producing 770 metric horsepower (570 kW; 760 shp), and two propeller shafts. She had a dive time of 15 seconds and was capable of operating at a depth of 75 metres (246 ft).

The submarine was designed for a maximum surface speed of 11.5 knots (21.3 km/h; 13.2 mph) and a submerged speed of 6.6 knots (12.2 km/h; 7.6 mph). When submerged, she could operate for 40 nautical miles (74 km; 46 mi) at 4.5 knots (8.3 km/h; 5.2 mph); when surfaced, she could travel 9,850 nautical miles (18,240 km; 11,340 mi) at 7 knots (13 km/h; 8.1 mph). UC-106 was fitted with six 100 centimetres (39 in) mine tubes, fourteen UC 200 mines, three 50 centimetres (20 in) torpedo tubes (one on the stern and two on the bow), seven torpedoes, and one 10.5 cm (4.1 in) SK L/45 or 8.8 cm (3.5 in) Uk L/30 deck gun . Her complement was twenty-six crew members.

== Construction and career ==
The U-boat was launched on 25 May 1918 and completed on 11 November 1918. Because UC-106 was finished after the end of fighting, she was never commissioned into the German Imperial Navy; had she been so commissioned, she would have been named SM UC-106. (Note: "SM" stands for "Seiner Majestät" (English: His Majesty's) and combined with the U for Unterseeboot would be translated as His Majesty's Submarine.) UC-106 was awarded to the United Kingdom as a war reparation and broken up in 1921.
