= Type UC III submarine =

1918 German submarine class

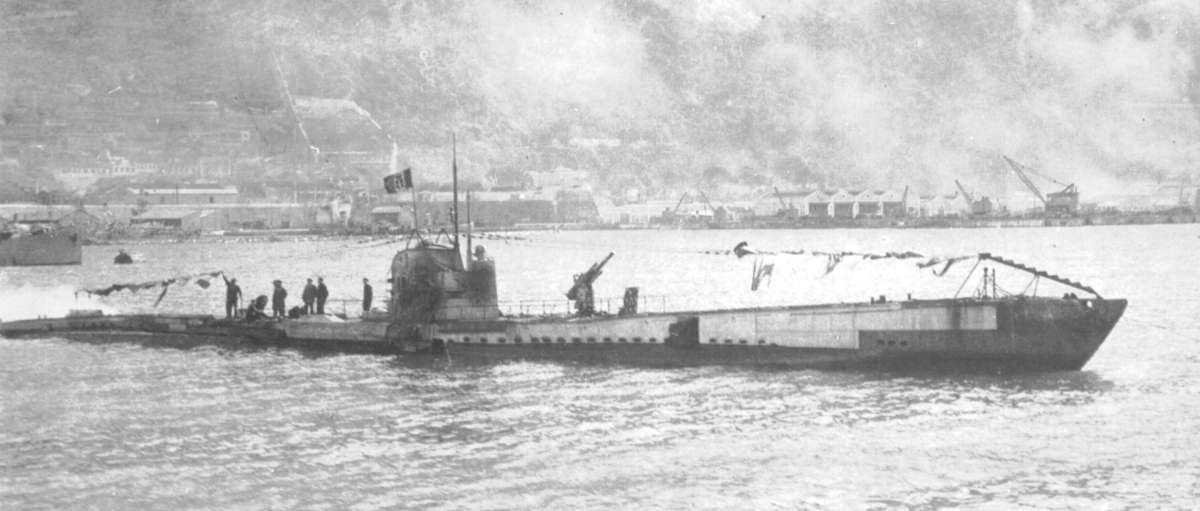
- UC-93 in Italy, 1918

Class overview
- Builders: AG Weser, Bremen; Blohm & Voss, Hamburg; Vulcan, Hamburg; Germaniawerft, Kiel
- Operators: Imperial German Navy
- Preceded by: UC II
- Cost: 3,303,000 German paper marks
- Built: 1917–1918
- In commission: 1918–1919
- Planned: 113
- Building: 59
- Completed: 25
- Canceled: 54
- Lost: 1

General characteristics
- Class & type: German Type UC III submarine
- Displacement: 491 t (483 long tons), surfaced; 571 t (562 long tons), submerged
- Length: 56.51 m (185 ft 5 in) (o/a); 42.20 m (138 ft 5 in) (pressure hull)
- Beam: 5.54 m (18 ft 2 in) (o/a)
- Draft: 3.77 m (12 ft 4 in)
- Propulsion: 2 × propeller shafts; 2 × 6-cylinder, 4-stroke diesel engines, 600 PS (440 kW; 590 bhp); 2 × electric motors, 770 PS (570 kW; 760 shp)
- Speed: 11.5 knots (21.3 km/h; 13.2 mph), surfaced; 6.6 knots (12.2 km/h; 7.6 mph), submerged
- Range: 9,850 nautical miles (18,240 km; 11,340 mi) at 7 knots (13 km/h; 8.1 mph), surfaced; 40 nmi (74 km; 46 mi) at 4.5 knots (8.3 km/h; 5.2 mph), submerged
- Test depth: 75 m (246 ft)
- Complement: 32
- Armament: 6 × 100 cm (39.4 in) mine tubes; 14 × UC 200 mines; 3 × 50 cm (19.7 in) torpedo tubes (2 bow external; one stern); 7 × torpedoes; 1 × 10.5 cm (4.1 in) SK L/45 or 8.8 cm (3.5 in) Uk L/30 deck gun
- Notes: 15-second diving time

Type UC III minelaying submarines were used by the Imperial German Navy (Kaiserliche Marine) during World War I. They displaced 474 tonnes (467 long tons) at the surface and 571 t (562 long tons) submerged, carried guns, 7 torpedoes and up to 14 mines. The ships were double-hulled with improved range and sea-keeping compared to the UC II type. The type had better seagoing, maneuvering and turning capabilities than its predecessor, while underwater stability was reduced.

A total of 113 Type UC III submarines were ordered by the Imperial German Navy, but only 25 U-boats were completed before the Armistice with Germany in 1918. Of those, 16 U-boats actually served in the war. 54 building orders were cancelled in 1918, while 34 U-boats were never completed and broken up in the ship yards.

== Design ==
German Type UC III submarines had a displacement of 491 tonnes (483 long tons) when at the surface and 571 tonnes (562 long tons) while submerged. They had a length overall of 56.51 m (185 ft 5 in), a beam of 5.54 m (18 ft 2 in), and a draught of 3.77 m (12 ft 4 in). The submarines were powered by two six-cylinder four-stroke diesel engines each producing 300 metric horsepower (220 kW; 300 shp) (a total of 600 metric horsepower [440 kW; 590 shp]), two electric motors producing 770 metric horsepower (570 kW; 760 shp), and two propeller shafts. They had a dive time of 15 seconds and were capable of operating at a depth of 75 metres (246 ft).

The submarines were designed for a maximum surface speed of 11.5 knots (21.3 km/h; 13.2 mph) and a submerged speed of 6.6 knots (12.2 km/h; 7.6 mph). When submerged, they could operate for 40 nautical miles (74 km; 46 mi) at 4.5 knots (8.3 km/h; 5.2 mph); when surfaced, they could travel 9,850 nautical miles (18,240 km; 11,340 mi) at 7 knots (13 km/h; 8.1 mph). UC III-class boats were fitted with six 100-centimetre (39 in) mine tubes, fourteen UC 200 mines, three 50-centimetre (20 in) torpedo tubes (one on the stern and two on the bow), seven torpedoes, and one 10.5 cm (4.1 in) SK L/45 or 8.8 cm (3.5 in) Uk L/30 deck gun. Their complement was twenty-six crew members.

== List of Type UC III submarines ==
=== Serving in World War I ===
There were 16 Type UC III submarines serving with the Imperial German Navy during World War I.

- SM UC-90
- SM UC-91
- SM UC-92
- SM UC-93
- SM UC-94
- SM UC-95
- SM UC-96
- SM UC-97
- SM UC-98
- SM UC-99
- SM UC-100
- SM UC-101
- SM UC-102
- SM UC-103
- SM UC-104
- SM UC-105

=== Completed after Armistice and surrendered to the Allies ===
- SM UC-106
- SM UC-107
- SM UC-108
- SM UC-109
- SM UC-110
- SM UC-111
- SM UC-112
- SM UC-113
- SM UC-114

=== Broken up at yard ===
- SM UC-80
- SM UC-81
- SM UC-82
- SM UC-83
- SM UC-84
- SM UC-85
- SM UC-86
- SM UC-87
- SM UC-88
- SM UC-89
- SM UC-115
- SM UC-116
- SM UC-117
- SM UC-118
- SM UC-119
- SM UC-120
- SM UC-121
- SM UC-122
- SM UC-123
- SM UC-124
- SM UC-125
- SM UC-126
- SM UC-127
- SM UC-128
