= 10.5 cm SK L/45 naval gun =

German quick-loading cannon

10.5 cm SK L/45
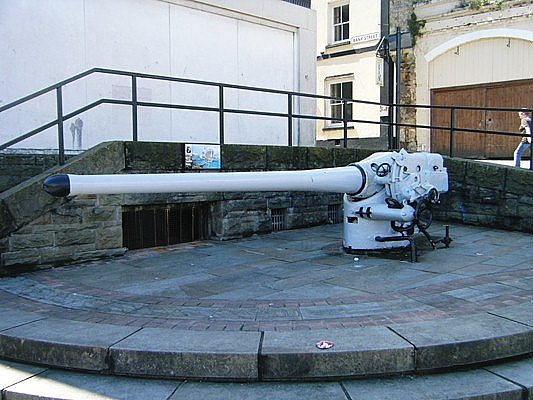
- The gun from the submarine SM UB-91, displayed as a memorial at Chepstow in Wales
- Type: Naval gun
- Place of origin: German Empire

Service history
- In service: 1907–1945
- Used by: German Empire; Nazi Germany; Ottoman Empire
- Wars: World War I World War II

Production history
- Designed: About 1906–1907
- Manufacturer: Peddinghaus

Specifications
- Mass: 1,450 kg (3,200 lb)
- Length: 4.725 m (15 ft 6.0 in)
- Width: 2.1 m (6.9 ft)
- Shell: Fixed Brass Casing: 25.5 kg (56 lb)
- Shell weight: 17.4 kg (38 lb)
- Caliber: 10.5 cm (4.1 in)
- Breech: Horizontal sliding-block
- Elevation: Dependent on mounting: MPL C/06: -10° to +30°; Tbts LC/16: -10° to +50°; Ubts LC/16: -10° to +50°; Flak 45: -5° to +70°; MPLC/30: -9° to +80°
- Traverse: 360°
- Rate of fire: 15 RPM
- Muzzle velocity: 710 m/s (2,300 ft/s)
- Effective firing range: 12,700 m (41,700 ft)
- Maximum firing range: Horizontal: 12,700 m (13,900 yd) at 30° Vertical: 8,230 m (27,000 ft) at 80°

The 10.5 cm SK L/45 (Schnelladekanone Länge 45, quick-loading cannon with a barrel length of 45 calibers) was a German naval gun that was used in World War I and World War II and was the successor of the older 10.5 cm SK L/40 naval gun.

== Description ==
The 10.5 cm SK L/45 gun weighed 1,450 kilograms (3,200 lb), had an overall length of 472.5 cm (15 ft 6 in). It used a horizontal sliding-block breech design. The cradle is usually mounted on a conical pedestal mount, bolted to the submarine deck.

The gun was carefully designed according to the requirements of submarine operations and was therefore streamlined in design. Many items were manufactured from brass to resist corrosion.

It was used on many German and foreign ships like SMS Mowe and Ottoman cruiser Midilli.

== Naval use ==
- B 97 class
- Galeb class
- Graudenz class
- Karlsruhe class
- Kolberg class
- Magdeburg class
- Pillau class
- Type 35
- Type U 66
- Type U 87
- Type UB III
- Type UE II
- V25 class

== Gallery ==
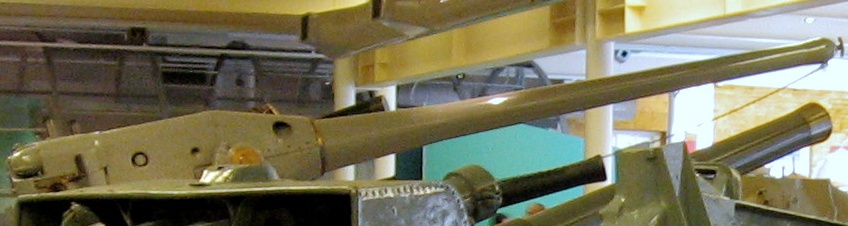
Gun, partly obscured, from submarine SM U-98, at Imperial War Museum, London

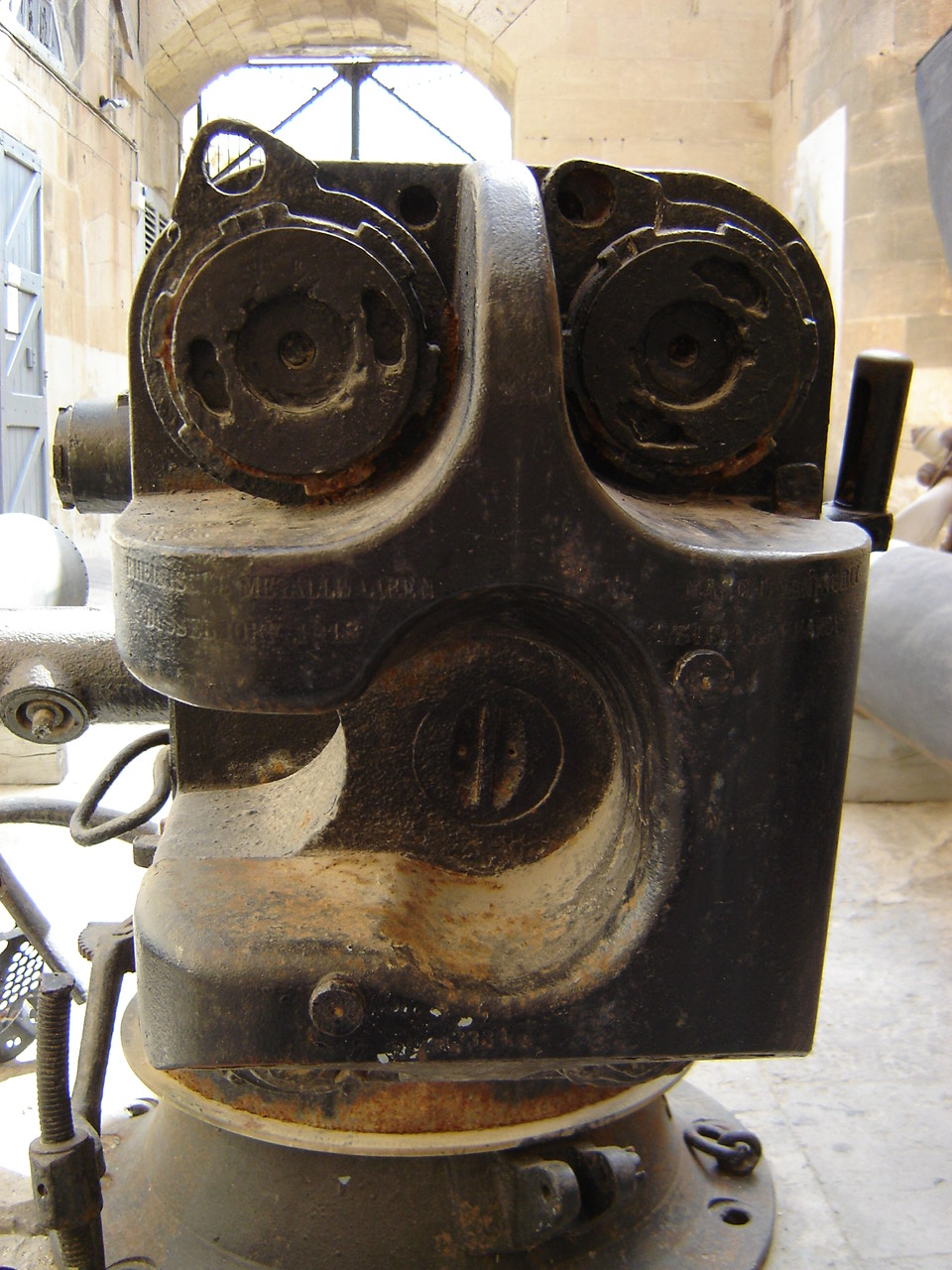
Gun breech, in Malta

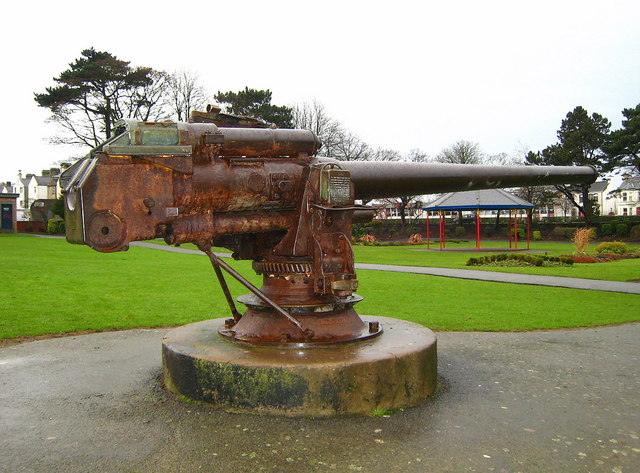
Gun from SM U-19 in Bangor

== See also ==
- List of naval guns

=== Weapons of comparable role, performance and era ===
- QF 4 inch Mk V naval gun Approximate British equivalent firing slightly lighter shell
- 4"/50 caliber gun Approximate US equivalent, firing slightly lighter shell at higher velocity

== Bibliography ==
- Campbell, John (2002). Naval Weapons of World War Two. London: Conway Maritime Press. ISBN 0-87021-459-4.
- Gander, Terry; Chamberlain, Peter (1979). Weapons of the Third Reich: An Encyclopedic Survey of All Small Arms, Artillery and Special Weapons of the German Land Forces 1939–1945. New York: Doubleday. ISBN 0-385-15090-3.
- Hogg, Ian V. (1997). German Artillery of World War Two (2nd corrected ed.). Mechanicsville, PA: Stackpole Books. ISBN 1-85367-480-X.
- Rolf, Rudi (1998). Der Atlantikwall: Bauten der deutschen Küstenbefestigungen 1940-1945. Osnabrück: Biblio. ISBN 3-7648-2469-7.
- Rolf, Rudi (2004). A Dictionary on Modern Fortification: An Illustrated Lexicon on European Fortification in the Period 1800-1945. Middleburg, Netherlands: PRAK.
