= List of Operation Deadlight U-boats =

116 U-boats were scuttled or otherwise sunk in 1945 and 1946 in Operation Deadlight. They had been surrendered by the Kriegsmarine to the Allies at the end of the Second World War. They were sunk by air attack, torpedo and naval gunfire off the Irish and Scottish coasts, while a number sank while under tow.

== Table of Operation Deadlight U-boats ==
Boat	Type	Surrendered	Place	Sunk	Location	Departed	Method	Notes
U-143	IID	5 May 1945	Heligoland	22 December 1945	55.58N 09.35W	Loch Ryan	Naval gunfire	Tow parted, sunk by HMS Onslow
U-145	IID	5 May 1945	Heligoland	22 December 1945	55.47N 09.56W	Loch Ryan	Naval gunfire	Tow parted, sunk HMS Onslow
U-149	IID	5 May 1945	Heligoland	21 December 1945	55.40N 08.00W	Loch Ryan	Naval gunfire	Tow parted, sunk ORP Piorun
U-150	IID	5 May 1945	Heligoland	21 December 1945	56.04N 09.35W	Loch Ryan	Naval gunfire	HMS Onslaught and HMS Powey
U-155	IXC	5 May 1945	Baring Bay	21 December 1945	55.35N 07.39W	Loch Ryan	Naval gunfire	Tow parted, sunk ORP Błyskawica
U-170	IXC/40	9 May 1945	Horten Naval Base	30 November 1945	55.44N 07.53W	Loch Ryan	Naval gunfire	HMS Onslaught and ORP Piorun
U-218	VIID	12 May 1945	Bergen	4 December 1945	55.28N 07.18W	Loch Ryan		Foundered in tow
U-244	VIIC	14 May 1945	Loch Eriboll	14 May 1945	55.46N 08.32W	Loch Eriboll	Naval gunfire	Tow parted, sunk ORP Piorun
U-245	VIIC	9 May 1945	Bergen	7 December 1945	55.25N 06.19W	Loch Ryan		Foundered in tow
U-249	VIIC	10 May 1945	Portland Harbour	13 December 1945	56.10N 10.05W	Loch Ryan	Torpedo	Sunk HMS Tantivy
U-255	VIIC	17 May 1945	Loch Eriboll	13 December 1945	55.50N 10.05W	Loch Eriboll	Aircraft rockets	
U-278	VIIC	9 May 1945	Narvik	31 December 1945	55.44N 08.21W	Lisahally	Naval gunfire	HMS Onslow and ORP Błyskawica
U-281	VIIC	9 May 1945	Kristiansand–Süd	30 November 1945	55.50N 10.05W	Loch Ryan		Foundered in tow
U-291	VIIC	5 May 1945	Cuxhaven	20 December 1945	55.50N 09.08W	Loch Ryan	Naval gunfire	HMS Onslaught
U-293	VIIC/41	11 May 1945	Loch Eriboll	13 December 1945	55.50N 10.05W	Loch Ryan	Naval gunfire	HMS Orwell
U-294	VIIC/41	9 May 1945	Narvik	31 December 1945	55.44N 08.40W	Lisahally	Naval gunfire	HMS Offa and HMS Zealous
U-295	VIIC/41	9 May 1945	Narvik	17 December 1945	56.14N 10.37W	Loch Ryan	Naval gunfire	ORP Błyskawica
U-298	VIIC/41	9 May 1945	Bergen	29 November 1945	55.35N 07.45W	Loch Ryan	Naval gunfire	HMS Onslow and HMS Cubitt
U-299	VIIC/41	9 May 1945	Kristiansand Süd	4 December 1945	55.38N 07.54W	Loch Ryan	Naval gunfire	HMS Onslow and HMS Cubitt
U-312	VIIC	9 May 1945	Narvik	29 November 1945	55.35N 07.54W	Lisahally	Naval gunfire	HMS Onslow
U-313	VIIC	9 May 1945	Narvik	27 December 1945	55.40N 08.24W	Loch Ryan		Foundered in tow
U-318	VIIC/41	9 May 1945	Narvik	21 December 1945	55.47N 08.30W	Loch Ryan	Naval gunfire	ORP Piorun
U-328	VIIC/41	9 May 1945	Bergen	30 November 1945	55.50N 10.05W	Loch Ryan	Aircraft	Fleet Air Arm
U-363	VIIC	9 May 1945	Narvik	31 December 1945	55.45N 08.18W	Lisahally	Naval gunfire	HMS Onslaught and ORP Błyskawica
U-368	VIIC	5 May 1945	Heligoland	17 December 1945	56.14N 10.37W	Loch Ryan	Naval gunfire	
U-369	VIIC	9 May 1945	Kristiansand	30 November 1945	55.31N 07.27W	Scapa Flow		
U-427	VIIC	9 May 1945	Narvik	21 December 1945	56.04N 09.35W	Loch Ryan	Unknown	
U-481	VIIC	9 May 1945	Narvik	30 November 1945	56.11N 10.00W	Loch Ryan	Unknown	
U-483	VIIC	9 May 1945	Trondheim	30 November 1945	56.10N 10.05W	Loch Ryan	Unknown	
U-485	VIIC	12 May 1945	Gibraltar	8 December 1945	56.10N 10.05W	Loch Ryan	Unknown	
U-516	IXC	14 May 1945	Loch Eriboll	2 January 1946	56.06N 09.00W	Lisahally		
U-532	IXC/40	13 May 1945	Loch Eriboll	9 December 1945	56.08N 10.07W	Loch Ryan	Torpedo	Sunk by submarine HMS Tantivy
U-539	IXC/40	9 May 1945	Bergen	4 December 1945	55.38N 07.57W	Loch Ryan		Foundered in tow
U-541	IXC/40	12 May 1945	Gibraltar	5 January 1946	55.38N 07.35W	Lisahally	Naval gunfire	Tow parted, sunk HMS Onslaught and HMS Zealous
U-637	VIIC	9 May 1945	Stavanger	21 December 1945	55.35N 07.46W	Loch Ryan		Foundered in tow
U-668	VIIC	9 May 1945	Narvik	31 December 1945	56.03N 09.24W	Lisahally	Naval gunfire	Tow parted, sunk by HMS Onslaught
U-680	VIIC	5 May 1945	Baring Bay	28 December 1945	55.24N 06.29W	Loch Ryan	Naval gunfire	HMS Onslaught
U-716	VIIC	9 May 1945	Narvik	11 December 1945	55.50N 10.05W	Loch Ryan	Air attack	
U-720	VIIC	5 May 1945	Heligoland	21 December 1945	56.04N 09.35W	Loch Ryan	Naval gunfire	
U-739	VIIC	13 May 1945	Emden	16 December 1945	56.10N 10.05W	Loch Ryan	Air attack	
U-760	VIIC	8 September 1943	Vigo	13 December 1945	55.50N 10.05W	Ferrol, Spain		Interned in Spain
U-764	VIIC	14 May 1945	Loch Eriboll	2 February 1946	56.06N 09.00W	Lisahally	Naval gunfire	ORP Piorun
U-773	VIIC	9 May 1945	Trondheim	8 December 1945	56.10N 10.05W	Loch Ryan	Unknown	
U-775	VIIC	9 May 1945	Trondheim	8 December 1945	55.40N 08.25W	Loch Ryan	Naval gunfire	
U-776	VIIC	16 May 1945	Portland	3 December 1945	55.08N 05.30W	Portland		Foundered
U-778	VIIC	9 May 1945	Bergen	4 December 1945	55.32N 07.70W	Loch Ryan		Foundered
U-779	VIIC	5 May 1945	Cuxhaven	17 December 1945	55.50N 10.05W	Loch Ryan	Naval gunfire	HMS Onslow and HMS Cubitt
U-802	IXC/40	11 May 1945	Loch Eriboll	31 December 1945	55.30N 08.25W	Lisahally		Foundered in tow
U-806	IXC/40	6 May 1945	Aarhus	21 December 1945	55.44N 8.18W	Loch Ryan	Naval gunfire	ORP Błyskawica
U-825	VIIC	13 May 1945	Loch Eriboll	3 January 1946	55.31N 07.30W	Lisahally	Unknown	
U-826	VIIC	11 May 1945	Loch Eriboll	1 December 1945	56.10N 10.05W	Loch Ryan	Unknown	
U-861	IXD2	9 May 1945	Trondheim	31 December 1945	55.25N 07.15W	Lisahally		
U-868	IXC/40	9 May 1945	Bergen	30 November 1945	55.48N 08.33W	Loch Ryan		
U-874	IXD2	9 May 1945	Horten	31 December 1945	55.74N 09.27W	Lisahally	Naval gunfire	HMS Offa
U-875	IXD2	9 May 1945	Bergen	31 December 1945	55.41N 08.28W	Lisahally		
U-883	IXD/42	5 May 1945	Cuxhaven	31 December 1945	55.44N 08.40W	Lisahally		
U-901	VIIC	15 May 1945	Stavanger	5 January 1946	55.50N 8.30W	Lisahally	Unknown	
U-907	VIIC	9 May 1945	Bergen	7 December 1945	55.17N 05.59W	Loch Ryan		
U-928	VIIC	9 May 1945	Bergen	16 December 1945	56.06N 10.05W	Lisahally		
U-930	VIIC/41	9 May 1945	Bergen	29 December 1945	55.20N 07.35W	Lisahally	Naval gunfire	HMS Onslow
U-956	VIIC	13 May 1945	Loch Eriboll	17 December 1945	55.50N 10.05W	Loch Ryan	Naval gunfire	
U-968	VIIC	9 May 1945	Narvik	29 November 1945	55.24N 06.22W	Loch Ryan		
U-975	VIIC	9 May 1945	Horten	10 February 1946	55.42N 09.01W	Lisahally		HMS Loch Arkaig
U-978	VIIC	9 May 1945	Trondheim	11 December 1945	56.10N 10.05W	Loch Ryan		
U-991	VIIC	9 May 1945	Bergen	11 December 1945	56.10N 10.05W	Loch Ryan	Torpedo	Sunk by submarine HMS Tantivy
U-992	VIIC	9 May 1945	Narvik	16 December 1945	56.10N 10.05W	Loch Ryan	Naval gunfire	
U-994	VIIC	9 May 1945	Trondheim	5 December 1945	55.50N 08.30W	Loch Ryan		Foundered in tow
U-997	VIIC/41	9 May 1945	Narvik	13 December 1945	55.50N 10.05W	Loch Ryan	Air attack	
U-1002	VIIC/41	9 May 1945	Bergen	13 December 1945	56.10N 10.05W	Lisahally	Unknown causes	
U-1004	VIIC/41	9 May 1945	Bergen	1 December 1945	56.10N 10.05W	Loch Ryan	Naval gunfire	
U-1005	VIIC/41	14 May 1945	Bergen	5 December 1945	55.33N 08.27W	Loch Ryan		Foundered in tow
U-1009	VIIC/41	10 May 1945	Loch Eriboll	16 December 1945	55.31N 07.24W	Loch Ryan	Naval gunfire	
U-1010	VIIC/41	14 May 1945	Loch Eriboll	7 January 1946	55.37N 07.49W	Lisahally	Naval gunfire	ORP Garland
U-1019	VIIC/41	9 May 1945	Trondheim	7 December 1945	55.27N 07.56W	Loch Ryan	Naval gunfire	
U-1022	VIIC/41	9 May 1945	Bergen	29 December 1945	55.40N 08.15W	Loch Ryan	Unknown	
U-1023	VIIC/41	10 May 1945	Portland	7 January 1946	55.49N 08.24W	Lisahally	Unknown	
U-1052	VIIC	9 May 1945	Bergen	9 December 1945	55.50N 10.05W	Loch Ryan	Aircraft	816 Naval Air Squadron
U-1061	VIIF	9 May 1945	Bergen	1 December 1945	56.10N 10.05W	Loch Ryan	Naval gunfire	
U-1102	VIIC	13 May 1945	Hohwacht Bay	21 December 1945	56.04N 09.35W	Loch Ryan	Naval gunfire	
U-1103	VIIC/41	8 May 1945	Cuxhaven	30 December 1945	56.03N 10.05W	Loch Ryan	Naval gunfire	
U-1104	VIIC/41	9 May 1945	Bergen	1 December 1945	56.10N 10.05W	Loch Ryan	Naval gunfire	
U-1109	VIIC/41	12 May 1945	Loch Eriboll	6 January 1946	55.49N 08.31W	Lisahally	Torpedoes	HMS Templar
U-1110	VIIC/41	14 May 1945	List	21 December 1945	55.45N 08.19W	Loch Ryan	Naval gunfire	
U-1163	VIIC/41	9 May 1945	Kristiansand	11 December 1945	55.50N 10.05W	Loch Ryan	Air attack	
U-1165	VIIC/41	9 May 1945	Narvik	30 December 1945	55.44N 08.40W	Lisahally	Unknown	
U-1194	VIIC	9 May 1945	Cuxhaven	22 December 1945	55.59N 09.55W	Loch Ryan	Naval gunfire	
U-1198	VIIC	8 May 1945	Cuxhaven	17 December 1945	56.14N 10.37W	Loch Ryan		
U-1203	VIIC	9 May 1945	Trondheim	8 December 1945	55.50N 10.05W	Loch Ryan		
U-1230	IXC/40	5 May 1945	Heligoland	17 December 1945	55.50N 10.05W	Loch Ryan	Naval gunfire	HMS Cubitt
U-1233	IXC/40	5 May 1945	Baring Bay	29 December 1945	55.51N 08.54W	Loch Ryan	Naval gunfire	HMS Onslaught
U-1271	VIIC/41	9 May 1945	Bergen	8 December 1945	55.28N 07.20W	Loch Ryan		
U-1272	VIIC/41	10 May 1945	Bergen	8 December 1945	55.50N 10.05W	Loch Ryan		
U-1301	VIIC/41	9 May 1945	Bergen	16 December 1945	55.50N 10.05W	Loch Ryan	Aircraft bombs	
U-1307	VIIC/41	9 May 1945	Bergen	9 December 1945	55.50N 10.05W	Loch Ryan	Aircraft rockets	
U-2321	XXIII	9 May 1945	Kristiansand Süd	27 November 1945	56.10N 10.05W	Loch Ryan	Naval gunfire	HMS Onslaught and ORP Błyskawica
U-2322	XXIII	9 May 1945	Stavanger	27 November 1945	56.10N 10.05W	Loch Ryan	Naval gunfire	HMS Onslaught and ORP Błyskawica
U-2324	XXIII	9 May 1945	Stavanger	27 November 1945	56.10N 10.05W	Loch Ryan	Naval gunfire	HMS Onslow and ORP Błyskawica
U-2325	XXIII	9 May 1945	Kristiansand Süd	28 November 1945	56.10N 10.05W	Loch Ryan	Naval gunfire	HMS Onslow and ORP Błyskawica
U-2328	XXIII	9 May 1945	Bergen	27 November 1945	56.12N 09.48W	Loch Ryan		Foundered under tow
U-2329	XXIII	9 May 1945	Stavanger	28 November 1945	56.10N 10.05W	Loch Ryan	Naval gunfire	HMS Onslow and ORP Piorun
U-2334	XXIII	9 May 1945	Kristiansand Süd	28 November 1945	56.10N 10.05W	Loch Ryan	Naval gunfire	HMS Onslow and ORP Piorun
U-2335	XXIII	9 May 1945	Kristiansand Süd	28 November 1945	56.10N 10.05W	Loch Ryan	Naval gunfire	HMS Onslow and ORP Piorun
U-2336	XXIII	15 May 1945	Kiel	3 January 1946	56.06N 09.00W	Lisahally	Naval gunfire	HMS Offa
U-2337	XXIII	9 May 1945	Kristiansand Süd	28 November 1945	56.10N 10.05W	Loch Ryan	Naval gunfire	HMS Onslow and ORP Piorun
U-2341	XXIII	8 May 1945	Cuxhaven	31 December 1945	55.44N 08.19W	Lisahally	Naval gunfire	HMS Onslaught and ORP Błyskawica
U-2345	XXIII	9 May 1945	Stavanger	27 November 1945	56.10N 10.05W	Loch Ryan	Scuttled	
U-2350	XXIII	9 May 1945	Kristiansand Süd	28 November 1945	56.10N 10.05W	Loch Ryan	Naval gunfire	HMS Onslow and ORP Piorun
U-2351	XXIII	5 May 1945	Flensburg	3 January 1946	55.50N 08.20W	Lisahally	Naval gunfire	HMS Offa
U-2354	XXIII	9 May 1945	Kristiansand Süd	22 December 1945	56.00N 10.05W	Loch Ryan	Naval gunfire	HMS Onslow
U-2356	XXIII	5 May 1945	Cuxhaven	6 January 1946	55.50N 08.20W	Lisahally	Naval gunfire	HMS Onslaught
U-2361	XXIII	9 May 1945	Kristiansand Süd	27 November 1945	56.10N 10.05W	Loch Ryan	Naval gunfire	HMS Onslow and ORP Błyskawica
U-2363	XXIII	9 May 1945	Kristiansand Süd	28 November 1945	56.10N 10.05W	Loch Ryan	Naval gunfire	HMS Onslow and ORP Piorun
U-2502	XXI	9 May 1945	Horten	2 January 1946	56.06N 09.00W	Moville		
U-2506	XXI	9 May 1945	Bergen	5 January 1946	55.37N 07.30W	Moville		
U-2511	XXI	9 May 1945	Bergen	7 January 1946	55.33N 07.38W	Moville	Naval gunfire	Tow parted, sunk by HMS Solebay
U-3514	XXI	9 May 1945	Bergen	12 February 1946	56.00N 10.05W	Loch Ryan	Naval gunfire, depth charges, squid	HMS Loch Arkaig
Boat	Type	Surrendered	Place	Sunk	Location	Departed	Method	Notes

Note: 116 U-boats were involved in Operation Deadlight (counting U-760).

== Bibliography ==
- Sharpe, Peter (1998). U-Boat Fact File: Detailed Service Histories of the Submarines Operated by the Kriegsmarine 1935–1945. Leicester: Midland Publishing. ISBN 1-85780-072-9.
