= List of shipwrecks in December 1945 =

The list of shipwrecks in December 1945 includes ships sunk, foundered, grounded, or otherwise lost during December 1945.

== 1 December ==
List of shipwrecks: 1 December 1945
Ship	State	Description
Aighai	Greece	The cargo ship struck a mine and sank off the Gironde estuary, France.
USS Bellona	United States Navy	The Achelous-class repair ship ran aground at Iwo Jima, Japan. Unsalvageable, she was dispersed by explosives on 14 May 1946.
U-826	Kriegsmarine	Operation Deadlight: The Type VIIC submarine was scuttled in the Atlantic Ocean (56°10′N 10°05′W).
U-1004	Kriegsmarine	Operation Deadlight: The Type VIIC/41 submarine was scuttled in the Atlantic Ocean (56°10′N 10°05′W).
U-1061	Kriegsmarine	Operation Deadlight: The Type VIIF submarine was scuttled in the Atlantic Ocean (56°10′N 10°05′W).
U-1104	Kriegsmarine	Operation Deadlight: The Type VIIC/41 submarine was scuttled in the Atlantic Ocean (56°10′N 10°05′W).

== 3 December ==
List of shipwrecks: 3 December 1945
Ship	State	Description
U-776	Kriegsmarine	Operation Deadlight: The Type VIIC submarine foundered in the Atlantic Ocean (55°08′N 5°30′W).
U-994	Kriegsmarine	Operation Deadlight: The Type VIIC submarine foundered in the Atlantic Ocean (55°50′N 8°30′W).

== 4 December ==
List of shipwrecks: 4 December 1945
Ship	State	Description
RFA Ennerdale	Royal Fleet Auxiliary	The Landing Ship, Gantry struck a mine and was severely damaged at Port Swettenham, Malaya. She was on a voyage from Penang to Port Swettenham. Subsequently repaired and returned to service.
HMS NSC(L) 91	Royal Navy	The auxiliary vessel, a converted LCT-4-class landing craft tank, was lost.
USS Osamekin	United States Navy	The 325-ton, 100-foot (30.5 m) tug sank in the Gulf of Alaska south of Kodiak Island.
U-218	Kriegsmarine	Operation Deadlight: The Type VIID submarine was scuttled in the Atlantic Ocean 8.9 nautical miles (16.5 km) north of Inishtrahull Island, County Donegal, Ireland (approximately 55°28′N 7°18′W).
U-299	Kriegsmarine	Operation Deadlight: The Type VIIC/41 submarine was scuttled in the Atlantic Ocean (55°38′N 7°54′W).
U-539	Kriegsmarine	Operation Deadlight: The Type IXC/40 submarine foundered in the Atlantic Ocean (55°38′N 7°57′W) whilst under tow to be scuttled.
U-777	Kriegsmarine	Operation Deadlight: The Type VIIC submarine foundered in the Atlantic Ocean 16 nautical miles (30 km) north east of Malin Head, County Donegal, Ireland (55°32′N 7°07′W) whilst under tow to be scuttled.

== 5 December ==
List of shipwrecks: 5 December 1945
Ship	State	Description
U-1005	Kriegsmarine	Operation Deadlight: The Type VIIC/41 submarine foundered in the Atlantic Ocean (55°33′N 8°27′W).

== 7 December ==
List of shipwrecks: 7 December 1945
Ship	State	Description
U-245	Kriegsmarine	Operation Deadlight: The Type VIIC submarine was scuttled in the Atlantic Ocean (55°25′N 6°19′W).
U-907	Kriegsmarine	Operation Deadlight: The Type VIIC submarine was scuttled in the Atlantic Ocean (55°17′N 5°59′W).
U-1019	Royal Navy	Operation Deadlight: The Type VIIC/41 submarine was scuttled in the Atlantic Ocean (55°27′N 7°56′W).

== 8 December ==
List of shipwrecks: 8 December 1945
Ship	State	Description
Eileen Wayman	United Kingdom	The 115.6-foot (35.2 m), 194-ton trawler was wrecked on rocks under Sheshader Cliffs at Grannan Point, Isle of Lewis in the early hours of the day, slipped off the rocks and sank at daybreak.
U-485	Kriegsmarine	Operation Deadlight: The Type VIIC submarine sank in the Atlantic Ocean (56°10′N 10°05′W).
U-773	Kriegsmarine	Operation Deadlight: The Type VIIC submarine sank in the Atlantic Ocean (56°10′N 10°05′W).
U-775	Kriegsmarine	Operation Deadlight: The Type VIIC submarine scuttled in the Atlantic Ocean (55°40′N 8°25′W).
U-1203	Kriegsmarine	Operation Deadlight: The Type VIIC submarine scuttled in the Atlantic Ocean (55°50′N 10°05′W).
U-1271	Kriegsmarine	Operation Deadlight: The Type VIIC/41 submarine scuttled in the Atlantic Ocean (55°28′N 7°20′W).
U-1272	Kriegsmarine	Operation Deadlight: The Type VIIC/41 submarine scuttled in the Atlantic Ocean (55°50′N 10°05′W).

== 9 December ==
List of shipwrecks: 9 December 1945
Ship	State	Description
U-532	Kriegsmarine	Operation Deadlight: The Type IXC/40 submarine was sunk as a target when torpedoed and sunk in the Atlantic Ocean (56°08′N 10°07′W) by HMS Tantivy (Royal Navy).
U-1052	Kriegsmarine	Operation Deadlight: The Type VIIC submarine was sunk as a target in the Atlantic Ocean (55°50′N 10°05′W by Fairey Firefly aircraft of 816 Squadron, Fleet Air Arm based on HMS Nairana (Royal Navy).
U-1307	Kriegsmarine	Operation Deadlight: The Type VIIC/41 submarine was sunk as a target in the Atlantic Ocean by a rocket attack by Fairey Firefly aircraft on 816 Squadron, Fleet Air Arm based on HMS Nairana (Royal Navy).
Sekirei Maru	Japan	According to an official report from the former Japan Transport Ministry, a wooden passenger ship heading for Akashi from Iwaya Port, Awaji Island, Hyogo Prefecture, Japan, departed with 349 people, which is more than three times the capacity, sank due to storms and overcrowded on capacity, and 45 people were rescued. However, the captain refused to rescue, and the remaining 304 person were drowned.

== 10 December ==
List of shipwrecks: 10 December 1945
Ship	State	Description
Kenmar	United States	The cargo ship ran aground off the Proposti Lighthouse, Italy and was wrecked.
T. A. Johnston	United States	The Liberty ship ran aground on Egmont Point, Dorset, United Kingdom. Refloated on 13 December.
William C. Ralston	United States	The Liberty ship was driven ashore in a typhoon at Okinawa, Japan and was declared a constructive total loss.

== 11 December ==
List of shipwrecks: 11 December 1945
Ship	State	Description
Kosin Maru	Japan	The cargo ship was driven ashore at Kawasaki. She was declared a total loss.
U-716	Kriegsmarine	Operation Deadlight: The Type VIIC submarine was scuttled in the Atlantic Ocean (55°50′N 10°05′W).
U-978	Kriegsmarine	Operation Deadlight: The Type VIIC submarine was scuttled in the Atlantic Ocean (55°50′N 10°05′W).
U-991	Kriegsmarine	Operation Deadlight: The Type VIIC submarine was scuttled in the Atlantic Ocean (56°10′N 10°05′W).
U-1163	Kriegsmarine	Operation Deadlight: The Type VIIC/41 submarine was scuttled in the Atlantic Ocean (55°50′N 10°05′W).

== 13 December ==
List of shipwrecks: 13 December 1945
Ship	State	Description
Empire Tigaven	United Kingdom	The coastal tanker collided off Flamborough Head, Yorkshire with Cormont (unknown flag) and was abandoned. All fourteen crew were rescued by the Flamborough lifeboat.
HMS N 86	Royal Navy	Operation Deadlight: The Type VIIC submarine was scuttled in the Atlantic Ocean (56°10′N 10°05′W).
U-255	Kriegsmarine	Operation Deadlight: The Type VIIC submarine was scuttled in the Atlantic Ocean (55°50′N 10°05′W).
U-293	Kriegsmarine	Operation Deadlight: The Type VIIC/41 submarine was scuttled in the Atlantic Ocean (55°50′N 10°05′W).
U-295	Kriegsmarine	Operation Deadlight: The Type VIIC/41 submarine was scuttled in the Atlantic Ocean (56°14′N 10°37′W).
U-760	Kriegsmarine	Operation Deadlight: The Type VIIC submarine was scuttled in the Atlantic Ocean (55°50′N 10°05′W).
U-997	Kriegsmarine	Operation Deadlight: The Type VIIC/41 submarine was scuttled in the Atlantic Ocean (55°50′N 10°05′W).
U-1002	Kriegsmarine	Operation Deadlight: The Type VIIC/41 submarine was scuttled in the Atlantic Ocean (56°10′N 10°05′W).

== 14 December ==
List of shipwrecks: 14 December 1945
Ship	State	Description
CHa-65	Imperial Japanese Navy	The minesweeper, a converted former CHa-1-class auxiliary submarine chaser, was wrecked off Hachinoe while sweeping for mines, later broken up.

== 16 December ==
List of shipwrecks: 16 December 1945
Ship	State	Description
U-483	Kriegsmarine	Operation Deadlight: The Type VIIC submarine sank in the Atlantic Ocean (56°10′N 10°05′W).
U-739	Kriegsmarine	Operation Deadlight: The Type VIIC submarine was scuttled in the Atlantic Ocean (56°10′N 10°05′W).
U-928	Kriegsmarine	Operation Deadlight: The Type VIIC submarine was scuttled in the Atlantic Ocean (56°06′N 10°05′W).
U-992	Kriegsmarine	Operation Deadlight: The Type VIIC submarine was scuttled in the Atlantic Ocean (56°06′N 10°05′W).
U-1009	Kriegsmarine	Operation Deadlight: The Type VIIC/41 submarine was scuttled in the Atlantic Ocean (55°31′N 7°24′W).
U-1301	Kriegsmarine	Operation Deadlight: The Type VIIC/41 submarine was bombed and sunk in the Atlantic Ocean (55°50′N 10°05′W) by British aircraft.

== 17 December ==
List of shipwrecks: 17 December 1945
Ship	State	Description
U-368	Kriegsmarine	Operation Deadlight: The Type VIIC submarine was scuttled in the Atlantic Ocean (56°14′N 10°37′W).
U-779	Kriegsmarine	Operation Deadlight: The Type VIIC submarine was scuttled in the Atlantic Ocean (55°50′N 10°05′W) by HMS Cubitt and HMS Onslow (both Royal Navy).
U-956	Kriegsmarine	Operation Deadlight: The Type VIIC submarine was scuttled in the Atlantic Ocean (55°50′N 10°05′W).
U-1198	Kriegsmarine	Operation Deadlight: The Type VIIC submarine was scuttled in the Atlantic Ocean (56°14′N 10°37′W).
U-1230	Kriegsmarine	Operation Deadlight: The Type IXC/40 submarine was scuttled in the Atlantic Ocean (55°50′N 10°05′W) by HMS Cubitt (Royal Navy).

== 18 December ==
List of shipwrecks: 18 December 1945
Ship	State	Description
Empire Rhodes	United Kingdom	The cargo ship caught fire at Gdynia, Poland and was scuttled to put out the fire in her cargo of jute. She burnt until 3 January 1946. Later refloated and sold to be scuttled but was repaired and returned to service in 1947 as Culter.

== 19 December ==
List of shipwrecks: 19 December 1945
Ship	State	Description
Gladbrook	Australia	Gladbrook The barque was beached at Rangitoto Island, New Zealand.
Nathaniel Bacon	United States	The Liberty ship struck a mine in the Tyrrhenian Sea (42°23′N 26°30′E) and was beached at Civitavecchia, Lazio, Italy. She was declared a constructive total loss. The bow section was scrapped in situ in 1946. The stern section was sold in 1950 and joined to the bow section of Bert Williams (Italy), the new ship being named Boccadasse.
Terborch	Netherlands	The cargo ship ran aground on the Goodwin Sands, Kent, United Kingdom. She was later refloated.

== 20 December ==
List of shipwrecks: 20 December 1945
Ship	State	Description
U-291	Kriegsmarine	Operation Deadlight: The Type VIIC submarine was scuttled in the Atlantic Ocean (55°50′N 9°08′W).

== 21 December ==
List of shipwrecks: 21 December 1945
Ship	State	Description
U-149	Kriegsmarine	Operation Deadlight: The Type IID submarine was scuttled in the Atlantic Ocean (55°40′N 8°00′W).
U-150	Kriegsmarine	Operation Deadlight: The Type IID submarine was scuttled in the Atlantic Ocean (56°04′N 9°35′W) by HMS Onslaught and HMS Powey (both Royal Navy).
U-155	Kriegsmarine	Operation Deadlight: The Type IXC submarine was scuttled in the Atlantic Ocean (55°35′N 7°39′W).
U-318	Kriegsmarine	Operation Deadlight: The Type VIIC/41 submarine was scuttled in the Atlantic Ocean (55°47′N 8°30′W).
U-427	Kriegsmarine	Operation Deadlight: The Type VII submarine was scuttled in the Atlantic Ocean (56°04′N 9°35′W).
U-637	Kriegsmarine	Operation Deadlight: The Type VIIC submarine foundered in the Atlantic Ocean (55°35′N 7°46′W) whilst under tow to the scuttling grounds.
U-720	Kriegsmarine	Operation Deadlight: The Type VII submarine was scuttled in the Atlantic Ocean (56°04′N 9°35′W).
U-806	Kriegsmarine	Operation Deadlight: The Type IXC/40 submarine was scuttled in the Atlantic Ocean (55°44′N 8°18′W).
U-1102	Kriegsmarine	Operation Deadlight: The Type VIIC submarine was scuttled in the Atlantic Ocean (56°04′N 9°35′W).
U-1110	Kriegsmarine	Operation Deadlight: The Type VIIC/41 submarine was scuttled in the Atlantic Ocean (55°45′N 8°19′W).

== 22 December ==
List of shipwrecks: 22 December 1945
Ship	State	Description
U-143	Kriegsmarine	Operation Deadlight: The Type IID submarine was scuttled in the Atlantic Ocean (55°58′N 9°35′W).
U-145	Kriegsmarine	Operation Deadlight: The Type IID submarine was scuttled in the Atlantic Ocean (55°47′N 9°56′W).
U-1194	Kriegsmarine	Operation Deadlight: The Type VIIC submarine was scuttled in the Atlantic Ocean (55°59′N 9°55′W).
U-2354	Kriegsmarine	Operation Deadlight: The Type XXIII submarine was shelled and sunk in the Atlantic Ocean (56°00′N 10°05′W) by HMS Onslow (Royal Navy).

== 23 December ==
List of shipwrecks: 23 December 1945
Ship	State	Description
Duncan L. Clinch	United States	The Liberty ship struck a mine and sank in the English Channel off Le Havre, France.

== 24 December ==
List of shipwrecks: 24 December 1945
Ship	State	Description
Northeastern Victory	United States	The Victory ship ran aground on the Goodwin Sands, Kent, United Kingdom. She was on a voyage from Galveston, Texas to Antwerp, Belgium. She broke in two and was a total loss.

== 26 December ==
List of shipwrecks: 26 December 1945
Ship	State	Description
Duchess of Hamilton	United Kingdom	The passenger ship ran aground in Loch Ryan. Refloated after fifteen minutes with damaged bows

== 27 December ==
List of shipwrecks: 27 December 1945
Ship	State	Description
Empire Tigawa	United Kingdom	The coastal tanker ran aground at Bolsax, Kattegat, Denmark. She was refloated and sailed to Kalundborg. Declared a constructive total loss.
U-313	Kriegsmarine	Operation Deadlight: The Type VIIC submarine was scuttled in the Atlantic Ocean (55°40′N 8°24′W).

== 28 December ==
List of shipwrecks: 28 December 1945
Ship	State	Description
U-680	Kriegsmarine	Operation Deadlight: The Type VIIC submarine was shelled and sunk in the Atlantic Ocean (55°24′N 6°29′W) by HMS Onslaught (Royal Navy).

== 29 December ==
List of shipwrecks: 29 December 1945
Ship	State	Description
USS Minivet	United States Navy	The Auk-class minesweeper struck a mine and sank in the Tsushima Straits with the loss of 31 of her 100 crew.
U-930	Kriegsmarine	Operation Deadlight: The Type VIIC/41 submarine was shelled and sunk in the Atlantic Ocean (55°20′N 7°35′W) by HMS Onslaught (Royal Navy).
U-1022	Kriegsmarine	Operation Deadlight: The Type VIIC/41 submarine was scuttled in the Atlantic Ocean (55°40′N 8°15′W).
U-1233	Kriegsmarine	Operation Deadlight: The Type IXC/40 submarine was scuttled in the Atlantic Ocean (55°51′N 8°54′W) by HMS Onslaught (Royal Navy).

== 30 December ==
List of shipwrecks: 30 December 1945
Ship	State	Description
Éridan	France	The cargo liner suffered an engine room fire at Saigon, French Indo-China. Repairs took 3 months to complete.
Lambridge	United Kingdom	Loaded with obsolete chemical munitions, the cargo ship was scuttled 120 nautical miles (140 mi; 220 km) northwest of Ireland at 55°30′N 11°00′W.
Pentridge Hill	United Kingdom	The cargo ship was scuttled in the Atlantic Ocean (55°30′N 13°00′W) with a cargo of obsolete chemical ammunition.
U-1103	Kriegsmarine	Operation Deadlight: The Type VIIC/41 submarine was scuttled in the Atlantic Ocean (56°03′N 10°05′W).
U-1165	Kriegsmarine	Operation Deadlight: The Type VIIC/41 submarine sank in the Atlantic Ocean (55°44′N 8°40′W).

== 31 December ==
List of shipwrecks: 31 December 1945
Ship	State	Description
R. F. Peckham	United States	The Liberty ship collided with Jesse Cottrell (United States). She was towed to Gibraltar, where she was declared a constructive total loss. Subsequently repaired and returned to service.
R. S. Wilson	United States	The Liberty ship ran aground at Boston, Massachusetts. She was declared a constructive total loss.
U-294	Kriegsmarine	Operation Deadlight: The Type VIIC/41 submarine was scuttled in the Atlantic Ocean (55°44′N 8°40′W).
U-363	Kriegsmarine	Operation Deadlight: The Type VIIC submarine was scuttled in the Atlantic Ocean (55°45′N 8°18′W).
U-668	Kriegsmarine	Operation Deadlight: The Type VIIC submarine was sunk in the Atlantic Ocean (56°03′N 9°24′W).
U-802	Kriegsmarine	Operation Deadlight: The Type IXC/40 submarine was scuttled in the Atlantic Ocean (55°30′N 8°25′W).
U-861	Kriegsmarine	Operation Deadlight: The Type IXD2 submarine was scuttled in the Atlantic Ocean (55°25′N 7°15′W).
U-874	Kriegsmarine	Operation Deadlight: The Type IXD2 submarine was scuttled in the Atlantic Ocean (55°47′N 9°27′W).
U-875	Kriegsmarine	Operation Deadlight: The Type IXD2 submarine was scuttled in the Atlantic Ocean (55°41′N 8°29′W).
U-883	Kriegsmarine	Operation Deadlight: The Type IXD/42 submarine was scuttled in the Atlantic Ocean (55°44′N 8°40′W).
U-2341	Kriegsmarine	Operation Deadlight: The Type XXIII submarine was shelled and sunk in the Atlantic Ocean (56°10′N 10°05′W by ORP Błyskawica (Marynarka Wojenna Rzeczypospolitej Polskiej) and HMS Onslaught (Royal Navy).

== Unknown date ==
List of shipwrecks: Unknown date December 1945
Ship	State	Description
CHa-152	Imperial Japanese Navy	The CHa-1-class auxiliary submarine chaser, surrendered in damaged condition, was scuttled sometime in December.
USS Industry	United States Navy	The hulk of the coastal minesweeper, aground at Okinawa since 9 October 1945, was disposed of by sinking.
