= German submarine U-2502 =

German World War II submarine

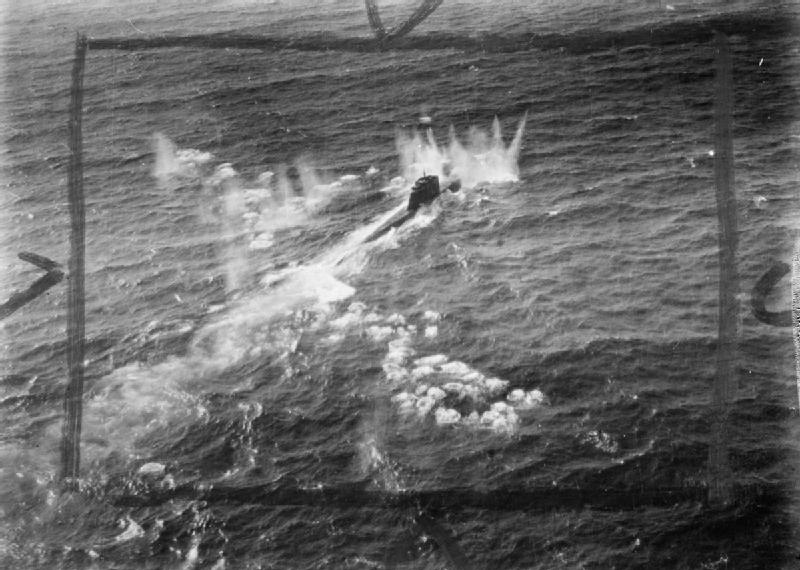
- A German type XXI submarine, U-2502, comes under cannon fire from a De Havilland Mosquito FB Mark VI during an attack on four surfaced U-boats (U-251, U-320, U-2502, U-2335) and an M-class minsweeper escort (M403) in the Kattegat by 22 Mosquitos of the Banff Strike Wing. U-2502 received only slight damage, but a type VIIC submarine (U-251) was sunk, a type XXIII (U-2335) seriously damaged and the minesweeper left burning.

History

Nazi Germany
- Name: U-2502
- Ordered: 6 November 1943
- Builder: Blohm & Voss, Hamburg
- Yard number: 2502
- Laid down: 25 April 1944
- Launched: 15 June 1944
- Commissioned: 19 July 1944
- Fate: Surrendered on 9 May 1945 at Horten Naval Base, Norway; Sunk on 2 January 1946 during Operation Deadlight

General characteristics
- Class & type: Type XXI submarine
- Displacement: 1,621 t (1,595 long tons) surfaced; 2,100 t (2,067 long tons) submerged
- Length: 76.70 m (251 ft 8 in) (o/a)
- Beam: 8 m (26 ft 3 in)
- Height: 11.30 m (37 ft 1 in)
- Draught: 6.32 m (20 ft 9 in)
- Propulsion: Diesel/Electric; 2 × MAN M6V40/46KBB supercharged 6-cylinder diesel engines, 2,000 PS (1,500 kW; 2,000 shp); 2 × SSW GU365/30 double-acting electric motors, 2,500 PS (1,800 kW; 2,500 shp); 2 × SSW GV232/28 silent running electric motors, 226 PS (166 kW; 223 shp)
- Speed: Surfaced: 15.6 knots (28.9 km/h; 18.0 mph) (diesel); 17.9 knots (33.2 km/h; 20.6 mph) (electric); Submerged: 17.2 knots (31.9 km/h; 19.8 mph) (electric); 6.1 knots (11.3 km/h; 7.0 mph) (silent running motors)
- Range: 15,500 nmi (28,700 km; 17,800 mi) at 10 knots (19 km/h; 12 mph) surfaced; 340 nmi (630 km; 390 mi) at 5 knots (9.3 km/h; 5.8 mph) submerged
- Test depth: 240 m (790 ft)
- Complement: 5 officers, 52 enlisted
- Sensors & processing systems: Type F432 D2 Radar Transmitter; FuMB Ant 3 Bali Radar Detector
- Armament: 6 × bow torpedo tubes; 23 × 53.3 cm (21 in) torpedoes (or 17 × torpedoes and 12 × mines); 4 × 2 cm (0.79 in) C/30 AA guns

Service record
- Part of: 31st U-boat Flotilla; 19 July 1944 – 1 March 1945; 11th U-boat Flotilla; 1 March – 8 May 1945
- Identification codes: M 41 658
- Commanders: Kptlt. Gert Mannesmann; 19 July 1944 – 8 April 1945; Kptlt. Hans Hornkohl; 9 – 12 April 1945; Kptlt. Heinz Franke; 12 April – 9 May 1945
- Operations: None
- Victories: None

German submarine U-2502 was a Type XXI U-boat (one of the "Elektroboote") of Nazi Germany's Kriegsmarine, built for service in World War II. The submarine was laid down on 25 April 1944 at the Blohm & Voss yard at Hamburg, launched on 15 June 1944, and commissioned on 19 July 1944 under the command of Kapitänleutnant Gert Mannesmann, who commanded her until 8 April 1945.

== Design ==
Like all Type XXI U-boats, U-2502 had a displacement of 1,621 tonnes (1,595 long tons) when at the surface and 1,819 tonnes (1,790 long tons) while submerged. She had a total length of 76.70 m (251 ft 8 in) (o/a), a beam of 8 m (26 ft 3 in), and a draught of 6.32 m (20 ft 9 in). The submarine was powered by two MAN SE supercharged six-cylinder M6V40/46KBB diesel engines each providing 2,000 metric horsepower (1,500 kilowatts; 2,000 shaft horsepower), two Siemens-Schuckert GU365/30 double-acting electric motors each providing 2,500 PS (1,800 kW; 2,500 shp), and two Siemens-Schuckert silent running GV232/28 electric motors each providing 226 PS (166 kW; 223 shp).

The submarine had a maximum surface speed of 15.6 knots (28.9 km/h; 18.0 mph) and a submerged speed of 17.2 knots (31.9 km/h; 19.8 mph). When running on silent motors the boat could operate at a speed of 6.1 knots (11.3 km/h; 7.0 mph). When submerged, the boat could operate at 5 knots (9.3 km/h; 5.8 mph) for 340 nautical miles (630 km; 390 mi); when surfaced, she could travel 15,500 nautical miles (28,700 km; 17,800 mi) at 10 knots (19 km/h; 12 mph). U-2502 was fitted with six 53.3 cm (21.0 in) torpedo tubes in the bow and four 2 cm (0.79 in) C/30 anti-aircraft guns. She could carry twenty-three torpedoes or seventeen torpedoes and twelve mines. The complement was five officers and fifty-two men.

== Fate ==
U-2502 conducted no patrols, and surrendered on 9 May 1945 in Horten Naval Base, Norway. She was then transferred to Oslo on 18 May 1945, then Scapa Flow on 6 June 1945. On 1 January 1946 she was taken to Moville, near Lisahally. From there she was sunk the following day at 56°06′N 09°00′W.

== Bibliography ==
- Busch, Rainer; Röll, Hans-Joachim (1999). German U-boat commanders of World War II : a biographical dictionary. Translated by Brooks, Geoffrey. London, Annapolis, Md: Greenhill Books, Naval Institute Press. ISBN 1-55750-186-6.
- Busch, Rainer; Röll, Hans-Joachim (1999). Der U-Boot-Krieg, 1939-1945: Deutsche U-Boot-Verluste von September 1939 bis Mai 1945 [German U-boat losses from September 1939 to May 1945] (in German). Vol. IV. Hamburg, Berlin, Bonn: Mittler. ISBN 3-8132-0514-2.
- Gröner, Erich; Jung, Dieter; Maass, Martin (1991). U-boats and Mine Warfare Vessels. German Warships 1815–1945. Vol. 2. Translated by Thomas, Keith; Magowan, Rachel. London: Conway Maritime Press. ISBN 0-85177-593-4.
