= German submarine U-883 =

German World War II submarine

Coordinates: 55.733°N 8.667°W

History

Nazi Germany
- Name: U-883
- Ordered: 2 April 1942
- Builder: DeSchiMAG AG Weser, Bremen
- Yard number: 1091
- Laid down: 27 July 1943
- Launched: 28 April 1944
- Commissioned: 27 March 1945
- Fate: Surrendered at Cuxhaven on 5 May 1945; Sunk in Operation Deadlight on 31 December 1945

General characteristics
- Class & type: Type IXD/42 submarine
- Displacement: 1,616 t (1,590 long tons) surfaced; 1,804 t (1,776 long tons) submerged; 2,150 t (2,116 long tons) total
- Length: 87.58 m (287 ft 4 in) o/a; 68.50 m (224 ft 9 in) pressure hull
- Beam: 7.50 m (24 ft 7 in) o/a; 4.40 m (14 ft 5 in) pressure hull
- Draught: 5.35 m (17 ft 7 in)
- Installed power: 4,400 PS (3,240 kW; 4,340 bhp) (diesels); 1,000 PS (740 kW; 990 shp) (electric)
- Speed: 19.2 knots (35.6 km/h; 22.1 mph) surfaced; 6.9 knots (12.8 km/h; 7.9 mph) submerged
- Range: 31,500 nmi (58,300 km; 36,200 mi) at 10 knots (19 km/h; 12 mph) surfaced; 57 nmi (106 km; 66 mi) at 4 knots (7.4 km/h; 4.6 mph) submerged
- Complement: 55-64 officers and enlisted
- Armament: 2 × torpedo tubes (two stern); 5 × 53.3 cm (21 in) torpedoes; 1 × 3.7 cm (1.5 in) Flak M42 AA gun; 2 × twin 2 cm (0.79 in) C/30 anti-aircraft guns

Service record
- Part of: 4th U-boat Flotilla; 27 March – 5 May 1945
- Identification codes: M 32 765
- Commanders: Kptlt. Hans-Ludwig Gaude; 1 May – 1 October 1944; Oblt.z.S. Johannes Uebel; 27 March – 5 May 1945
- Operations: None
- Victories: None

German submarine U-883 was a Type IXD/42 U-boat of Nazi Germany's Kriegsmarine in World War II.

Designed in 1942, U-883 was the only commissioned Type IXD/42 submarine, similar to the Type IXD submarine, but with increased engine power (increased from 4400 to 5400 ehp).

Commissioned on 27 March 1945, only weeks before the German capitulation, U-883 was surrendered at Cuxhaven on 5 May 1945. She was sunk on 31 December 1945 as part of Operation Deadlight.

== Design ==
German Type IXD42 submarines were considerably larger than the original Type IXs. U-883 had a displacement of 1,616 tonnes (1,590 long tons) when at the surface and 1,804 tonnes (1,776 long tons) while submerged. The U-boat had a total length of 87.58 m (287 ft 4 in), a pressure hull length of 68.50 m (224 ft 9 in), a beam of 7.50 m (24 ft 7 in), a height of 10.20 m (33 ft 6 in), and a draught of 5.35 m (17 ft 7 in). The submarine was powered by two MAN M 9 V 40/46 supercharged four-stroke, nine-cylinder diesel engines producing a total of 4,400 metric horsepower (3,240 kW; 4,340 shp) for use while surfaced, two Siemens-Schuckert 2 GU 345/34 double-acting electric motors producing a total of 1,000 shaft horsepower (1,010 PS; 750 kW) for use while submerged. She had two shafts and two 1.85 m (6 ft) propellers. The boat was capable of operating at depths of up to 200 metres (660 ft).

The submarine had a maximum surface speed of 19.2 knots (35.6 km/h; 22.1 mph) and a maximum submerged speed of 6.9 knots (12.8 km/h; 7.9 mph). When submerged, the boat could operate for 121 nautical miles (224 km; 139 mi) at 2 knots (3.7 km/h; 2.3 mph); when surfaced, she could travel 31,500 nautical miles (58,300 km; 36,200 mi) at 10 knots (19 km/h; 12 mph). U-883 was fitted with six 53.3 cm (21 in) torpedo tubes (four fitted at the bow and two at the stern), 24 torpedoes, one 10.5 cm (4.13 in) SK C/32 naval gun, 150 rounds, and a 3.7 cm (1.5 in) Flak M42 with 2575 rounds as well as two twin 2 cm (0.79 in) C/30 anti-aircraft guns with 8100 rounds. The boat had a complement of fifty-five.

== Bibliography ==
- Busch, Rainer; Röll, Hans-Joachim (1999). German U-boat commanders of World War II : a biographical dictionary. Translated by Brooks, Geoffrey. London, Annapolis, Md: Greenhill Books, Naval Institute Press. ISBN 1-55750-186-6.
- Busch, Rainer; Röll, Hans-Joachim (1999). Der U-Boot-Krieg, 1939-1945: Deutsche U-Boot-Verluste von September 1939 bis Mai 1945 [German U-boat losses from September 1939 to May 1945] (in German). Vol. IV. Hamburg, Berlin, Bonn: Mittler. ISBN 3-8132-0514-2.
- Gröner, Eric; Jung, Dieter; Maass, Martin (1991). German Warships 1815-1945: U-boats and Mine Warfare Vessels. Vol. 2. Translated by Thomas, Keith; Magowan, Rachel. London: Conway Maritime Press. ISBN 0-85177-593-4.
