= German submarine U-1061 =

German World War II submarine

History

Nazi Germany
- Name: U-1061
- Ordered: 25 August 1941
- Builder: Germaniawerft, Kiel
- Yard number: 695
- Laid down: 21 August 1942
- Launched: 22 April 1943
- Commissioned: 25 August 1943
- Fate: Surrendered on 9 May 1945; Scuttled on 1 December 1945 during Operation Deadlight

General characteristics
- Class & type: Type VIIF submarine
- Displacement: 1,084 tonnes (1,067 long tons) surfaced; 1,181 t (1,162 long tons) submerged
- Length: 77.63 m (254 ft 8 in) o/a; 60.40 m (198 ft 2 in) pressure hull
- Beam: 7.30 m (23 ft 11 in) o/a; 4.70 m (15 ft 5 in) pressure hull
- Height: 9.60 m (31 ft 6 in)
- Draught: 4.91 m (16 ft 1 in)
- Installed power: 2,800–3,200 PS (2,100–2,400 kW; 2,800–3,200 bhp) (diesels); 750 PS (550 kW; 740 shp) (electric)
- Propulsion: 2 shafts; 2 × diesel engines; 2 × electric motors
- Speed: 16.9–17.6 knots (31.3–32.6 km/h; 19.4–20.3 mph) surfaced
- Range: 14,700 nmi (27,200 km; 16,900 mi) at 10 knots (19 km/h; 12 mph) surfaced; 75 nmi (139 km; 86 mi) at 4 knots (7.4 km/h; 4.6 mph) submerged
- Test depth: 200 m (660 ft); Calculated crush depth: 220–240 m (720–790 ft)
- Crew: 4 officers, 42 enlisted
- Armament: 5 × 53.3 cm (21 in) torpedo tubes (4 bow, 1 stern); 14 × torpedoes or up to 40 in transport role; 1 × 3.7 centimetres (1.5 in) SK C/30 anti-aircraft gun (1,195 rounds); 2 × 2 centimetres (0.79 in) Flak anti-aircraft guns (4,380 rounds)

Service record
- Part of: 5th U-boat Flotilla; 25 August – 31 December 1943; 12th U-boat Flotilla; 1 January – 1 March 1944; 5th U-boat Flotilla; 1 March – 30 April 1944; 12th U-boat Flotilla; 1 May – 31 October 1944; 5th U-boat Flotilla; 1 November 1944 – 8 May 1945
- Identification codes: M 52 982
- Commanders: Oblt.z.S. Otto Hinrichs; 25 August 1943 – 19 March 1945; Oblt.z.S. Walter Jäger; 20 March – 9 May 1945
- Operations: 5 patrols: 1st patrol: a. 22 – 23 February 1944; b. 23 – 24 February 1944; c. 25 February – 2 March 1944; d. 5 – 10 March 1944; e. 11 – 12 March 1944; f. 13 – 14 March 1944; 2nd patrol: a. 6 – 8 April 1944; b. 8 – 12 April 1944; c. 18 – 29 April 1944; d. 18 – 20 May 1944; e. 22 – 24 May 1944; 3rd patrol: a. 27 – 29 May 1944; b. 29 May – 5 June 1944; c. 8 – 10 June 1944; d. 12 – 13 June 1944; e. 14 – 15 June 1944; f. 15 – 17 June 1944; 4th patrol: a. 1 – 3 July 1944; b. 3 – 5 July 1944; c. 5 – 6 July 1944; d. 7 – 9 July 1944; e. 13 – 15 July 1944; f. 17 – 18 July 1944; g. 19 – 20 July 1944; h. 21 – 23 July 1944; 5th patrol: a. 17 – 19 October 1944; b. 22 – 23 October 1944; c. 26 – 28 October 1944; d. 28 October – 3 November 1944; e. 20 – 21 January 1945; f. 7 – 9 February 1945; g. 24 – 29 April 1945; h. 1 – 4 May 1945
- Victories: None

German submarine U-1061 was one of a series of four Type VIIF submarine of Nazi Germany's Kriegsmarine during World War II.

U-1061 was one of four Type VIIF torpedo transport submarines, which could carry 40 torpedoes, and were used to re-supply other U-boats at sea. U-1061 commissioned on 25 August 1943, first served with 5th U-boat Flotilla for training, and later served with 12th U-boat Flotilla.

== Design ==
As one of the four German Type VIIF submarines, U-1061 had a displacement of 1,084 tonnes (1,067 long tons) when at the surface and 1,181 tonnes (1,162 long tons) while submerged. She had a total length of 77.63 m (254 ft 8 in), a pressure hull length of 60.40 m (198 ft 2 in), a beam of 7.30 m (23 ft 11 in), a height of 9.60 m (31 ft 6 in), and a draught of 4.91 m (16 ft 1 in). The submarine was powered by two Germaniawerft F46 supercharged four-stroke, six-cylinder diesel engines producing a total of 2,800 to 3,200 metric horsepower (2,060 to 2,350 kW; 2,760 to 3,160 shp) for use while surfaced, two AEG GU 460/8-276 double-acting electric motors producing a total of 750 shaft horsepower (760 PS; 560 kW) for use while submerged. She had two shafts and two 1.23 m (4 ft) propellers. The boat was capable of operating at depths of up to 230 metres (750 ft).

The submarine had a maximum surface speed of 16.9–17.6 knots (31.3–32.6 km/h; 19.4–20.3 mph) and a maximum submerged speed of 7.9 knots (14.6 km/h; 9.1 mph). When submerged, the boat could operate for 75 nautical miles (139 km; 86 mi) at 4 knots (7.4 km/h; 4.6 mph); when surfaced, she could travel 14,700 nautical miles (27,200 km; 16,900 mi) at 10 knots (19 km/h; 12 mph). U-1061 was fitted with five 53.3 cm (21 in) torpedo tubes (four fitted at the bow and one at the stern), fourteen torpedoes, one 8.8 cm (3.46 in) SK C/35 naval gun, 220 rounds, and various anti-aircraft gun. The boat had a complement of between forty-four.

== Service history ==
U-1061 completed five torpedo transport patrols before she surrendered at Bergen, Norway on 9 May 1945, and was later transported to Scotland for Operation Deadlight in which she was sunk on 1 December 1945 by naval gunfire.

== Bibliography ==
- Bishop, Chris (2006). Kriegsmarine U-Boats, 1939-45. London: Amber Books. ISBN 978-1-904687-96-2.
- Busch, Rainer; Röll, Hans-Joachim (1999). German U-boat commanders of World War II : a biographical dictionary. Translated by Brooks, Geoffrey. London, Annapolis, Md: Greenhill Books, Naval Institute Press. ISBN 1-55750-186-6.
- Busch, Rainer; Röll, Hans-Joachim (1999). Deutsche U-Boot-Verluste von September 1939 bis Mai 1945 [German U-boat losses from September 1939 to May 1945]. Der U-Boot-Krieg (in German). Vol. IV. Hamburg, Berlin, Bonn: Mittler. ISBN 3-8132-0514-2.
- Gröner, Erich; Jung, Dieter; Maass, Martin (1991). German Warships 1815–1945, U-boats and Mine Warfare Vessels. Vol. 2. Translated by Thomas, Keith; Magowan, Rachel. London: Conway Maritime Press. ISBN 0-85177-593-4.
