= HMS Tantivy =

Submarine of the Royal Navy

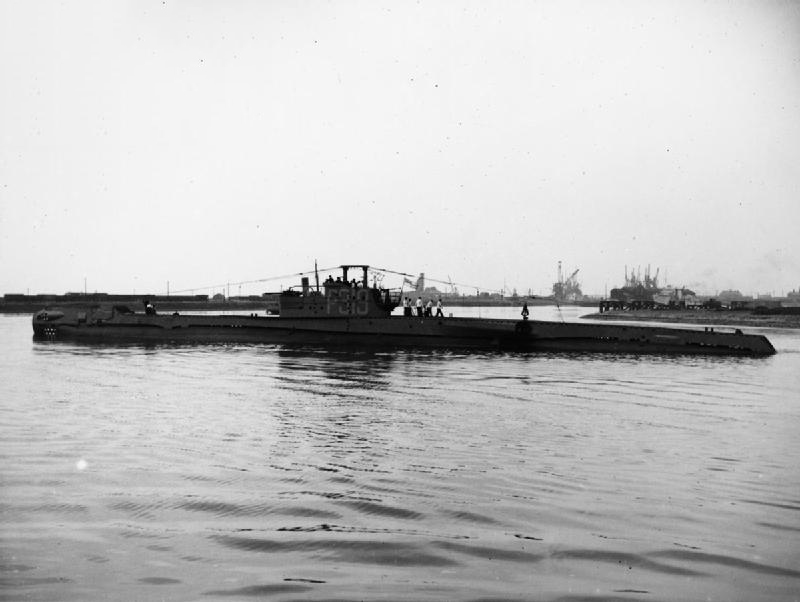
- HMS Tantivy

History

United Kingdom
- Name: HMS Tantivy
- Builder: Vickers-Armstrongs, Barrow
- Laid down: 4 July 1942
- Launched: 6 April 1943
- Commissioned: 25 July 1943
- Fate: Sunk as target 1951
- Badge

General characteristics
- Class & type: British T class submarine
- Displacement: 1,290 tons surfaced; 1,560 tons submerged
- Length: 276 ft 6 in (84.28 m)
- Beam: 25 ft 6 in (7.77 m)
- Draught: 12 ft 9 in (3.89 m) forward; 14 ft 7 in (4.45 m) aft
- Propulsion: Two shafts; Twin diesel engines 2,500 hp (1.86 MW) each; Twin electric motors 1,450 hp (1.08 MW) each
- Speed: 15.5 knots (28.7 km/h) surfaced; 9 knots (20 km/h) submerged
- Range: 4,500 nautical miles at 11 knots (8,330 km at 20 km/h) surfaced
- Test depth: 300 ft (91 m) max
- Complement: 61
- Armament: 6 internal forward-facing 21-inch (533 mm) torpedo tubes; 2 external forward-facing torpedo tubes; 2 external amidships rear-facing torpedo tubes; 1 external rear-facing torpedo tubes; 6 reload torpedoes; 1 x 4-inch (102 mm) deck gun; 3 anti aircraft machine guns

HMS Tantivy was a British submarine of the third group of the T class. She was built as P319 by Vickers-Armstrongs, Barrow, and launched on 6 April 1943. So far she is the only ship of the Royal Navy to bear the name Tantivy.

== Service ==
Tantivy served in the Far East for much of her wartime career, where she sank a Siamese sailing vessel, the Japanese merchant cargo ship Shiretoko Maru, the Japanese communications vessel No. 137, the Japanese barge No. 136, the Japanese motor sailing vessel Tachibana Maru No.47, a Japanese tug, two Japanese coasters, a Japanese sailing vessel, the small Japanese vessels Chokyu Maru No.2, Takasago Maru No.3, and Otori Maru, and twelve small unidentified vessels. She laid numerous mines.

She survived the war and continued in service with the Navy, finally being sunk as an anti-submarine target in the Cromarty Firth in 1951.
