= Operation Deadlight =

1946 UK operation to scuttle German U-boats

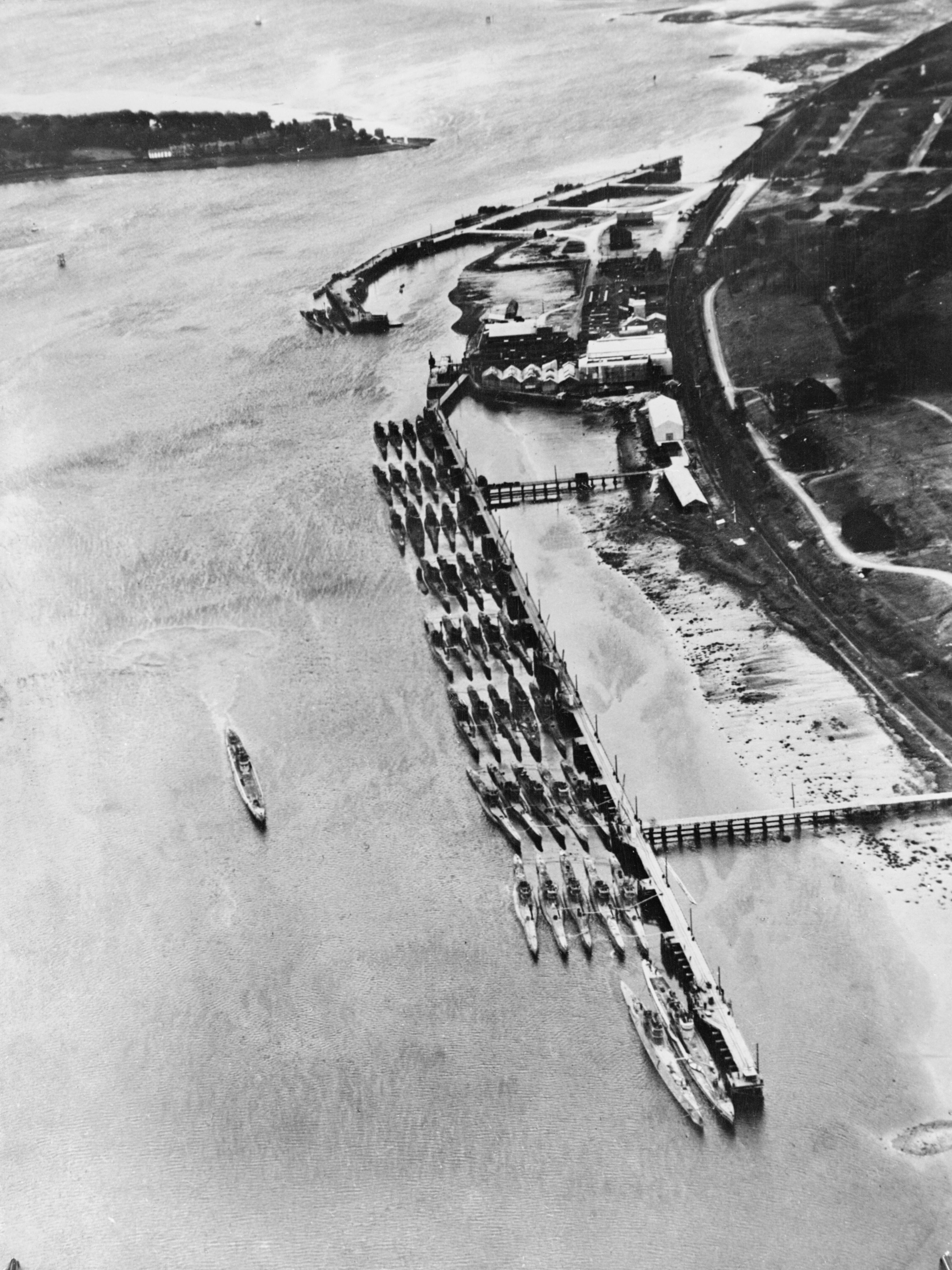
Forty-two surrendered U-boats moored at Lisahally, Northern Ireland, June 1945

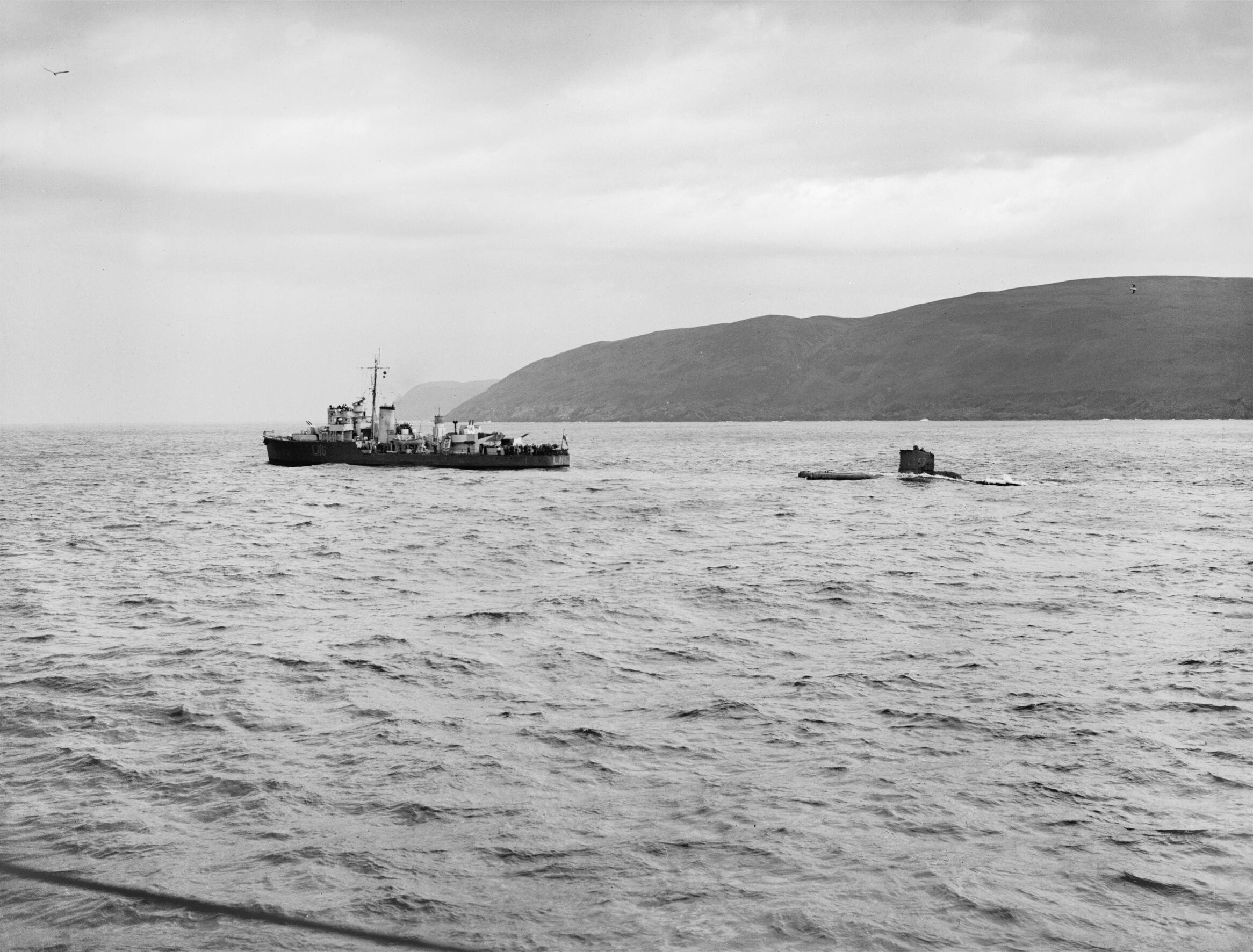
Polish Navy destroyer ORP Krakowiak towing German Type XXIII U-boat U-2337 out to sea for scuttling on 28 November 1945

Operation Deadlight was the code name for the Royal Navy operation of November 1945 – February 1946 to scuttle German U-boats surrendered to the Allies after the defeat of Germany near the end of World War II. After the surrender, political discussions continued between the Allies concerning the final disposal of the surviving German naval vessels, the result of which was an agreement to retain 30 U-boats in total, to be divided equally between the United Kingdom, the United States and the Soviet Union. The remainder would be scuttled.

== Operation ==
Of the 156 U-boats surrendered to the Allies by Germany at the end of World War II, 116 were scuttled as part of Operation Deadlight. The Royal Navy carried out the operation, and planned to tow the submarines to three areas about 100 miles (160 km) northwest of Ireland and sink them. The areas were code-named XX, YY, and ZZ. They intended to use XX as the main scuttling area, while towing 36 boats to ZZ to use as practice targets for aerial attack. YY was to be a reserve position where, if the weather was good enough, they could divert submarines from XX to sink with naval forces. Submarines that were not used for target practice were to be sunk with explosive charges, with naval gunfire if that failed.

When Operation Deadlight began, the navy found that many of the U-boats were in poor condition from being moored in exposed harbours while awaiting disposal. These issues, combined with poor weather, sank 56 of the boats before they reached the scuttling areas, and those that did reach the area were generally sunk by gunfire rather than explosive charges. The first sinking took place on 17 November 1945 and the last on 11 February 1946.

== U-boats excluded from Operation Deadlight ==
Several U-boats escaped Operation Deadlight. Some were claimed as prizes by the United Kingdom, France, Norway, and the Soviet Union. Four were in East Asia when Germany surrendered and were commandeered by Japan. U-181 was renamed I-501, U-195 – I-506, U-219 – I-505, U-862 – I-502, and two other boats, U-511 and U-1224, had been sold to Japan in 1943 and renamed RO-500 and RO-501. Two U-boats that survived Operation Deadlight became museum ships. U-505 was earmarked for scuttling, but American Rear Admiral Daniel V. Gallery argued successfully that she did not fall under Operation Deadlight. United States Navy Task Group 22.3, under Captain Gallery, had captured U-505 in battle on 4 June 1944. Having been captured not surrendered at the end of the war, she survived to become a war memorial at the Museum of Science and Industry in Chicago. U-995 was transferred to Norway by the United Kingdom in October 1948 and became the Norwegian Kaura. She was returned to Germany in 1965, to become a museum ship at Laboe in October 1971.

== Salvage proposals ==
In the late-1990s, a firm applied to the British Ministry of Defence for salvage rights to the Operation Deadlight U-boats, planning to raise up to a hundred of them. Because the U-boats were constructed in the pre-atomic age, the wrecks contain low-background steel metals that are not radioactively contaminated and valuable for certain research purposes. The ministry awarded no salvage rights, due to objections from Russia and the United States, and potentially from the United Kingdom.

Between 2001 and 2003, nautical archaeologist Innes McCartney discovered and surveyed fourteen of the U-boat wrecks, including the rare Type XXI U-boat U-2506, once under the command of Horst von Schroeter; the successful Type IXC U-boat, U-155 commanded by Adolf Piening and U-778, which was the most promising salvage.

In 2007, Derry City Council announced plans to raise U-778 to be the main exhibit of a new maritime museum. On 3 October 2007, an Irish diver named Michael Hanrahan died whilst filming the wreck as part of the salvage project. In November 2009, a spokesman from the council's heritage museum service announced the salvage project had been cancelled for cost reasons.

== See also ==
- HMS Ferret
- Operation Regenbogen (U-boat)
- Scuttling of the German fleet at Scapa Flow

== Bibliography ==
- Paterson, Lawrence (2009). Black Flag. The Surrender of Germany's U-Boat Forces 1945. Pen & Sword books. pp. 161–163. ISBN 978-1-84832-037-6.
- Sharpe, Peter (1998). U-Boat Fact File: Detailed Service Histories of the Submarines Operated by the Kriegsmarine 1935–1945. Leicester: Midland Publishing. ISBN 1-85780-072-9.
- Waller, Derek (2010). "Operation Deadlight". German U-boats of WWII – uboat.net. Archived from the original on 12 November 2010.
