= Wolfpack Wolf =

Wolf was a wolfpack of German U-boats that operated from 13 July to 1 August 1942, attacking Convoy ON 115 in the Battle of the Atlantic during World War II. They sank two ships sunk totalling 12,078 gross register tons (GRT) and damaged another (8,093 GRT).

== U-Boats & Commanders ==
The wolfpack comprised eleven U-boats, namely

U-Boat	Commander	From	To	Notes
U-43	Hans-Joachim Schwantke	13 Jul 1942	30 Jul 1942	
U-71	Hardo Rodler von Roithberg	13 Jul 1942	30 Jul 1942	
U-86	Walter Schug	13 Jul 1942	31 Jul 1942	
U-90	Hans-Jürgen Oldörp	13 Jul 1942	24 Jul 1942	Depth-charged and sunk by Canadian destroyer HMCS St. Croix (I81)
U-379	Paul-Hugo Kettner	13 Jul 1942	1 Aug 1942	
U-454	Burckhard Hackländer	13 Jul 1942	30 Jul 1942	
U-461	Wolf-Harro Stiebler	26 Jul 1942	1 Aug 1942	
U-552	Erich Topp	13 Jul 1942	30 Jul 1942	
U-597	Eberhard Bopst	13 Jul 1942	30 Jul 1942	
U-607	Ernst Mengersen	25 Jul 1942	30 Jul 1942	
U-704	Horst Wilhelm Kessler	13 Jul 1942	31 Jul 1942	

== Ships hit by this wolfpack ==
=== Broompark ===
U-552 struck again at 04:09 hours on 25 July, hitting the 5,136-ton British merchant ship Broompark. The ship was taken in tow by the tug USS Cherokee, but sank on 28 July about 50 nautical miles (93 km) SW of St. Johns. The master and three men were lost, while 38 men and 7 gunners were picked up by HMCS Brandon.

=== Empire Rainbow ===
At 07.57 hours on 26 July the 6,942-ton British merchant ship Empire Rainbow was hit and damaged by a torpedo fired by U-607 about 300 nautical miles (560 km) E of Cape Race. Later, at 08.11, the ship was hit again, this time by a torpedo fired by U-704, which sank her. The entire crew; Master, 38 men and 8 gunners were picked up by HMS Burnham and HMCS Dauphin.
