= German submarine U-704 =

German World War II submarine

History

Nazi Germany
- Name: U-704
- Ordered: 9 October 1939
- Builder: HC Stülcken & Sohn, Hamburg
- Yard number: 763
- Laid down: 26 August 1940
- Launched: 28 August 1941
- Commissioned: 18 November 1941
- Fate: Scuttled on 30 April 1945

General characteristics
- Class & type: Type VIIC submarine
- Displacement: 769 tonnes (757 long tons) surfaced; 871 t (857 long tons) submerged
- Length: 67.10 m (220 ft 2 in) o/a; 50.50 m (165 ft 8 in) pressure hull
- Beam: 6.20 m (20 ft 4 in) o/a; 4.70 m (15 ft 5 in) pressure hull
- Height: 9.60 m (31 ft 6 in)
- Draught: 4.74 m (15 ft 7 in)
- Installed power: 2,800–3,200 PS (2,100–2,400 kW; 2,800–3,200 bhp) (diesels); 750 PS (550 kW; 740 shp) (electric)
- Propulsion: 2 shafts; 2 × diesel engines; 2 × electric motors
- Speed: 17.7 knots (32.8 km/h; 20.4 mph) surfaced; 7.6 knots (14.1 km/h; 8.7 mph) submerged
- Range: 8,500 nmi (15,700 km; 9,800 mi) at 10 knots (19 km/h; 12 mph) surfaced; 80 nmi (150 km; 92 mi) at 4 knots (7.4 km/h; 4.6 mph) submerged
- Test depth: 230 m (750 ft); Crush depth: 250–295 m (820–968 ft)
- Complement: 4 officers, 40–56 enlisted
- Armament: 5 × 53.3 cm (21 in) torpedo tubes (four bow, one stern); 14 × torpedoes; 1 × 8.8 cm (3.46 in) deck gun (220 rounds); 1 x 2 cm (0.79 in) C/30 AA gun

Service record
- Part of: 8th U-boat Flotilla; 18 November 1941 – 30 June 1942; 7th U-boat Flotilla; 1 July 1942 – 1 April 1943; 21st U-boat Flotilla; 1 April – 31 May 1943; 24th U-boat Flotilla; 1 June – 31 August 1943; 23rd U-boat Flotilla; 1 September 1943 – 31 July 1944; 21st U-boat Flotilla; 1 August 1944 – 24 March 1945
- Identification codes: M 43 929
- Commanders: Oblt.z.S. / Kptlt. Horst Wilhelm Kessler; 18 November 1941 – April 1943; Oblt.z.S. Karl-Heinz Hagenau; 12 Jun 1943 – April 1944; Lt.z.S. Gerhard Ady; April – July 1944; Oblt.z.S. Wolfgang Schwarzkopf; 6 August – 18 December 1944; Oblt.z.S. Gerhard Nolte; 19 December 1944 – 24 March 1945
- Operations: 5 patrols: 1st patrol: 30 June – 16 August 1942; 2nd patrol: 9 – 15 September 1942; 3rd patrol: 5 October – 23 November 1942; 4th patrol: a. 1 – 2 January 1943; b. 7 January – 12 February 1943; 5th patrol: a. 14 March – 5 April 1943; b. 6 – 11 April 1943
- Victories: 1 merchant ship sunk (6,942 GRT)

German submarine U-704 was a Type VIIC U-boat of Nazi Germany's Kriegsmarine during World War II.

Commissioned on 18 November 1941 under the command of Kapitänleutnant Horst Wilhelm Kessler, U-704 carried out training operations as part of the 8th U-boat Flotilla until 30 June 1942.

== Design ==
German Type VIIC submarines were preceded by the shorter Type VIIB submarines. U-704 had a displacement of 769 tonnes (757 long tons) when at the surface and 871 tonnes (857 long tons) while submerged. She had a total length of 67.10 m (220 ft 2 in), a pressure hull length of 50.50 m (165 ft 8 in), a beam of 6.20 m (20 ft 4 in), a height of 9.60 m (31 ft 6 in), and a draught of 4.74 m (15 ft 7 in). The submarine was powered by two Germaniawerft F46 four-stroke, six-cylinder supercharged diesel engines producing a total of 2,800 to 3,200 metric horsepower (2,060 to 2,350 kW; 2,760 to 3,160 shp) for use while surfaced, two AEG GU 460/8–27 double-acting electric motors producing a total of 750 metric horsepower (550 kW; 740 shp) for use while submerged. She had two shafts and two 1.23 m (4 ft) propellers. The boat was capable of operating at depths of up to 230 metres (750 ft).

The submarine had a maximum surface speed of 17.7 knots (32.8 km/h; 20.4 mph) and a maximum submerged speed of 7.6 knots (14.1 km/h; 8.7 mph). When submerged, the boat could operate for 80 nautical miles (150 km; 92 mi) at 4 knots (7.4 km/h; 4.6 mph); when surfaced, she could travel 8,500 nautical miles (15,700 km; 9,800 mi) at 10 knots (19 km/h; 12 mph). U-704 was fitted with five 53.3 cm (21 in) torpedo tubes (four fitted at the bow and one at the stern), fourteen torpedoes, one 8.8 cm (3.46 in) SK C/35 naval gun, 220 rounds, and a 2 cm (0.79 in) C/30 anti-aircraft gun. The boat had a complement of between forty-four and sixty.

== Service history ==
U-704 set out on its first patrol, a transit to its operational base at Saint-Nazaire on 30 June 1942. During this patrol, U-704 formed part of wolfpack "Wolf" which was to patrol between Iceland and Greenland, out of the range of allied air cover. On 26 July 1942, U-704 torpedoed the 6,942 GRT British freighter Empire Rainbow, part of convoy Convoy ON 113. Empire Rainbow had already been damaged by a torpedo from U-607, and U-704's torpedo sank the freighter.

U-704 carried out a further four operational patrols under the command of Kessler from Saint Nazaire and La Pallice, sinking no further ships. U-704 did fire four torpedoes at the troopship Queen Elizabeth on 9 November 1942, with Kessler claiming a hit, although Queen Elizabeth was undamaged.

=== Fate ===
U-704 then served as a training submarine in the Baltic Sea for the rest of the war, and was scuttled at Vegesack on 30 April 1945.

=== Wolfpacks ===
U-704 took part in seven wolfpacks, namely:

- Wolf (13 – 31 July 1942)
- Pirat (31 July – 3 August 1942)
- Steinbrinck (3 – 11 August 1942)
- Panther (10 – 20 October 1942)
- Veilchen (20 October – 7 November 1942)
- Habicht (10 – 19 January 1943)
- Haudegen (19 January – 9 February 1943)

== Summary of raiding history ==
| Date | Ship Name | Nationality | Tonnage (GRT) | Fate |
|---|---|---|---|---|
| 26 July 1942 | Empire Rainbow | United Kingdom | 6,942 | Sunk |

== Bibliography ==
- Busch, Rainer; Röll, Hans-Joachim (1999). German U-boat commanders of World War II : a biographical dictionary. Translated by Brooks, Geoffrey. London, Annapolis, Md: Greenhill Books, Naval Institute Press. ISBN 1-55750-186-6.
- Busch, Rainer; Röll, Hans-Joachim (1999). Deutsche U-Boot-Verluste von September 1939 bis Mai 1945 [German U-boat losses from September 1939 to May 1945]. Der U-Boot-Krieg (in German). Vol. IV. Hamburg, Berlin, Bonn: Mittler. ISBN 3-8132-0514-2.
- Gröner, Erich; Jung, Dieter; Maass, Martin (1991). German Warships 1815–1945, U-boats and Mine Warfare Vessels. Vol. 2. Translated by Thomas, Keith; Magowan, Rachel. London: Conway Maritime Press. ISBN 0-85177-593-4.
- Blair, Clay (2000). Hitler's U-Boat War: The Hunters 1939–1942. London: Cassell. ISBN 0-304-35260-8.
- Blair, Clay (2000). Hitler's U-Boat War: The Hunted, 1942–1945. New York: Modern Library. ISBN 0-679-64033-9.
- Edwards, Bernard (1996). Dönitz and the Wolf Packs - The U-boats at War. Cassell Military Classics. pp. 75, 83, 89. ISBN 0-304-35203-9.
- Gardiner, Robert; Chesneau, Roger (1980). Conway's All The World's Fighting Warships 1922–1946. London: Conway Maritime Press. ISBN 0-85177-146-7.
