= Irish Oak =

Irish Oak may refer to

- Quercus petraea, a tree also known as the 'Irish oak'
- SS Irish Oak one of two steamships operated by Irish Shipping Ltd
- MV Irish Oak, one of two motor vessels operated by Irish Shipping Ltd

See also

- Irish Oaks, a horserace
