= German submarine U-416 =

German World War II submarine

History

Nazi Germany
- Name: U-416
- Ordered: 15 August 1940
- Builder: Danziger Werft, Danzig
- Yard number: 117
- Laid down: 11 August 1941
- Launched: 9 May 1942
- Commissioned: 4 November 1942
- Fate: Sunk, on 30 March 1943; Raised and sunk again on 12 December 1944

General characteristics
- Class & type: Type VIIC submarine
- Displacement: 769 tonnes (757 long tons) surfaced; 871 t (857 long tons) submerged
- Length: 67.10 m (220 ft 2 in) o/a; 50.50 m (165 ft 8 in) pressure hull
- Beam: 6.20 m (20 ft 4 in) o/a; 4.70 m (15 ft 5 in) pressure hull
- Height: 9.60 m (31 ft 6 in)
- Draught: 4.74 m (15 ft 7 in)
- Installed power: 2,800–3,200 PS (2,100–2,400 kW; 2,800–3,200 bhp) (diesels); 750 PS (550 kW; 740 shp) (electric)
- Propulsion: 2 shafts; 2 × diesel engines; 2 × electric motors.
- Speed: 17.7 knots (32.8 km/h; 20.4 mph) surfaced; 7.6 knots (14.1 km/h; 8.7 mph) submerged
- Range: 8,500 nmi (15,700 km; 9,800 mi) at 10 knots (19 km/h; 12 mph) surfaced; 80 nmi (150 km; 92 mi) at 4 knots (7.4 km/h; 4.6 mph) submerged
- Test depth: 230 m (750 ft); Crush depth: 250–295 m (820–968 ft)
- Complement: 4 officers, 40–56 enlisted
- Armament: 5 × 53.3 cm (21 in) torpedo tubes (four bow, one stern); 14 × torpedoes; 1 × 8.8 cm (3.46 in) deck gun (220 rounds); 2 × twin 2 cm (0.79 in) C/30 anti-aircraft guns

Service record
- Part of: 8th U-boat Flotilla; 4 November 1942 – 30 March 1943; 23rd U-boat Flotilla; 4 October 1943 – 1 July 1944; 21st U-boat Flotilla; 1 July – 12 December 1944
- Identification codes: M 49 853
- Commanders: Oblt.z.S. Christian Reich; 4 November 1942 – 30 March 1943; Oblt.z.S. Rudolf Zorn; 4 October – 14 November 1943; Kptlt. Heinz Zwang; 15 November 1943 – 15 May 1944; Oblt.z.S. Eberhard Rieger; 16 May – 12 December 1944
- Operations: None
- Victories: None

German submarine U-416 was a Type VIIC U-boat of Nazi Germany's Kriegsmarine during World War II.

She carried out no patrols. She did not sink or damage any ships.

She was sunk by a Soviet mine on 30 March 1943; raised and sunk again on 12 December 1944 in the Baltic Sea after colliding with a German ship.

== Design ==
German Type VIIC submarines were preceded by the shorter Type VIIB submarines. U-416 had a displacement of 769 tonnes (757 long tons) when at the surface and 871 tonnes (857 long tons) while submerged. She had a total length of 67.10 m (220 ft 2 in), a pressure hull length of 50.50 m (165 ft 8 in), a beam of 6.20 m (20 ft 4 in), a height of 9.60 m (31 ft 6 in), and a draught of 4.74 m (15 ft 7 in). The submarine was powered by two Germaniawerft F46 four-stroke, six-cylinder supercharged diesel engines producing a total of 2,800 to 3,200 metric horsepower (2,060 to 2,350 kW; 2,760 to 3,160 shp) for use while surfaced, two Siemens-Schuckert GU 343/38–8 double-acting electric motors producing a total of 750 metric horsepower (550 kW; 740 shp) for use while submerged. She had two shafts and two 1.23 m (4 ft) propellers. The boat was capable of operating at depths of up to 230 metres (750 ft).

The submarine had a maximum surface speed of 17.7 knots (32.8 km/h; 20.4 mph) and a maximum submerged speed of 7.6 knots (14.1 km/h; 8.7 mph). When submerged, the boat could operate for 80 nautical miles (150 km; 92 mi) at 4 knots (7.4 km/h; 4.6 mph); when surfaced, she could travel 8,500 nautical miles (15,700 km; 9,800 mi) at 10 knots (19 km/h; 12 mph). U-416 was fitted with five 53.3 cm (21 in) torpedo tubes (four fitted at the bow and one at the stern), fourteen torpedoes, one 8.8 cm (3.46 in) SK C/35 naval gun, 220 rounds, and two twin 2 cm (0.79 in) C/30 anti-aircraft guns. The boat had a complement of between forty-four and sixty.

== Service history ==
The submarine was laid down on 11 August 1941 at the Danziger Werft (yard) at Danzig (now Gdansk), as yard number 117, launched on 9 May 1942 and commissioned on 4 November under the command of Oberleutnant zur See Christian Reich.

She served with the 8th U-boat Flotilla from 4 November 1942 and the 23rd flotilla from 4 October 1943. She was reassigned to the 21st flotilla on 1 July 1944.

=== Fate ===
U-416 was sunk on 30 March 1943 by a mine laid by the Soviet submarine L-3 on 26 August 1942 near Bornholm (eastern Denmark). She was raised on 8 April 1943 and after repairs, used for training. She was in collision with the German minesweeper M 203 and sunk again on 12 December 1944 northwest of Pillau, (Balltiysk) in Russia.

== Bibliography ==
- Busch, Rainer; Röll, Hans-Joachim (1999). German U-boat commanders of World War II : a biographical dictionary. Translated by Brooks, Geoffrey. London, Annapolis, Md: Greenhill Books, Naval Institute Press. ISBN 1-55750-186-6.
- Busch, Rainer; Röll, Hans-Joachim (1999). Deutsche U-Boot-Verluste von September 1939 bis Mai 1945 [German U-boat losses from September 1939 to May 1945]. Der U-Boot-Krieg (in German). Vol. IV. Hamburg, Berlin, Bonn: Mittler. ISBN 3-8132-0514-2.
- Gröner, Erich; Jung, Dieter; Maass, Martin (1991). U-boats and Mine Warfare Vessels. German Warships 1815–1945. Vol. 2. Translated by Thomas, Keith; Magowan, Rachel. London: Conway Maritime Press. ISBN 0-85177-593-4.
- Kemp, Paul (1999). U-Boats Destroyed – German Submarine Losses in the World Wars. London: Arms & Armour. ISBN 1-85409-515-3.
