= German submarine U-72 (1940) =

German World War II submarine

History

Nazi Germany
- Name: U-72
- Ordered: 25 January 1939
- Builder: Germaniawerft, Kiel
- Yard number: 619
- Laid down: 28 December 1939
- Launched: 22 November 1940
- Commissioned: 4 January 1941
- Fate: Sunk by bombing, 30 March 1945

General characteristics
- Class & type: Type VIIC submarine
- Displacement: 769 tonnes (757 long tons) surfaced; 871 t (857 long tons) submerged
- Length: 67.10 m (220 ft 2 in) o/a; 50.50 m (165 ft 8 in) pressure hull
- Beam: 6.20 m (20 ft 4 in) o/a; 4.70 m (15 ft 5 in) pressure hull
- Height: 9.60 m (31 ft 6 in)
- Draught: 4.74 m (15 ft 7 in)
- Installed power: 2,800–3,200 PS (2,100–2,400 kW; 2,800–3,200 bhp) (diesels); 750 PS (550 kW; 740 shp) (electric)
- Propulsion: 2 shafts; 2 × diesel engines; 2 × electric motors
- Speed: 17.7 knots (32.8 km/h; 20.4 mph) surfaced; 7.6 knots (14.1 km/h; 8.7 mph) submerged
- Range: 8,500 nmi (15,700 km; 9,800 mi) at 10 knots (19 km/h; 12 mph) surfaced; 80 nmi (150 km; 92 mi) at 4 knots (7.4 km/h; 4.6 mph) submerged
- Test depth: 230 m (750 ft); Crush depth: 250–295 m (820–968 ft)
- Complement: 4 officers, 40–56 enlisted
- Armament: 2 × 53.3 cm (21 in) torpedo tubes (bow); 14 × torpedoes or 26 TMA mines; 1 × 8.8 cm (3.46 in) deck gun (220 rounds); 1 × 2 cm (0.79 in) C/30 anti-aircraft gun

Service record
- Part of: 21st U-boat Flotilla; 4 January – 8 June 1941; 24th U-boat Flotilla; 9 June – 1 July 1941; 21st U-boat Flotilla; 2 July 1941 – 30 March 1945
- Identification codes: M 21 325
- Commanders: K.Kapt. Hans-Werner Neumann; 4 January – September 1941; Oblt.z.S. Helmut Köster; September – 1 December 1941; Kptlt. Waldemar Mehl; 2 December 1941 – 6 May 1942; Oblt.z.S. Hans-Martin Scheibe; 7 May – 19 November 1942; Oblt.z.S. Helmut Lange; 20 November 1942 – 14 December 1943; Oblt.z.S. Paul Sander; 15 December 1943 – 19 May 1944; Oblt.z.S. Karl-Theodor Mayer; 20 May 1944 – 30 March 1945
- Operations: None
- Victories: None

German submarine U-72 was a Type VIIC submarine of Nazi Germany's Kriegsmarine during World War II.

U-72 was launched on 22 November 1940 and commissioned on 4 January 1941. U-72 served with the 21st U-boat Flotilla (a training unit), then with the 24th U-boat Flotilla (also a training unit), and again with the 21st U-boat Flotilla. She was used throughout the war as a training boat until being sunk in a daylight American bombing raid on 30 March 1945.

== Design ==
German Type VIIC submarines were preceded by the shorter Type VIIB submarines. U-72 had a displacement of 769 tonnes (757 long tons) when at the surface and 871 tonnes (857 long tons) while submerged. She had a total length of 67.10 m (220 ft 2 in), a pressure hull length of 50.50 m (165 ft 8 in), a beam of 6.20 m (20 ft 4 in), a height of 9.60 m (31 ft 6 in), and a draught of 4.74 m (15 ft 7 in). The submarine was powered by two Germaniawerft F46 four-stroke, six-cylinder supercharged diesel engines producing a total of 2,800 to 3,200 metric horsepower (2,060 to 2,350 kW; 2,760 to 3,160 shp) for use while surfaced, two AEG GU 460/8-276 double-acting electric motors producing a total of 750 metric horsepower (550 kW; 740 shp) for use while submerged. She had two shafts and two 1.23 m (4 ft) propellers. The boat was capable of operating at depths of up to 230 metres (750 ft).

The submarine had a maximum surface speed of 17.7 knots (32.8 km/h; 20.4 mph) and a maximum submerged speed of 7.6 knots (14.1 km/h; 8.7 mph). When submerged, the boat could operate for 80 nautical miles (150 km; 92 mi) at 4 knots (7.4 km/h; 4.6 mph); when surfaced, she could travel 8,500 nautical miles (15,700 km; 9,800 mi) at 10 knots (19 km/h; 12 mph). U-72 was fitted with two 53.3 cm (21 in) torpedo tubes at the bow, fourteen torpedoes, one 8.8 cm (3.46 in) SK C/35 naval gun, 220 rounds, and one 2 cm (0.79 in) C/30 anti-aircraft gun. The boat had a complement of between forty-four and sixty.

== Bibliography ==
- Busch, Rainer; Röll, Hans-Joachim (1999). German U-boat commanders of World War II : a biographical dictionary. Translated by Brooks, Geoffrey. London, Annapolis, Md: Greenhill Books, Naval Institute Press. ISBN 1-55750-186-6.
- Busch, Rainer; Röll, Hans-Joachim (1999). Deutsche U-Boot-Verluste von September 1939 bis Mai 1945 [German U-boat losses from September 1939 to May 1945]. Der U-Boot-Krieg (in German). Vol. IV. Hamburg, Berlin, Bonn: Mittler. ISBN 3-8132-0514-2.
- Gröner, Erich; Jung, Dieter; Maass, Martin (1991). German Warships 1815–1945, U-boats and Mine Warfare Vessels. Vol. 2. Translated by Thomas, Keith; Magowan, Rachel. London: Conway Maritime Press. ISBN 0-85177-593-4.
- Bishop, Chris (2006). Kriegsmarine U-Boats, 1939-45. London: Amber Books. ISBN 978-1-904687-96-2.
