= German submarine U-597 =

German World War II submarine

History

Nazi Germany
- Name: U-597
- Ordered: 16 January 1940
- Builder: Blohm & Voss, Hamburg
- Yard number: 573
- Laid down: 13 January 1941
- Launched: 1 October 1941
- Commissioned: 20 November 1941
- Fate: Sunk southwest of Iceland by a British aircraft on 12 October 1942

General characteristics
- Class & type: Type VIIC submarine
- Displacement: 769 tonnes (757 long tons) surfaced; 871 t (857 long tons) submerged
- Length: 67.10 m (220 ft 2 in) o/a; 50.50 m (165 ft 8 in) pressure hull
- Beam: 6.20 m (20 ft 4 in) o/a; 4.70 m (15 ft 5 in) pressure hull
- Height: 9.60 m (31 ft 6 in)
- Draught: 4.74 m (15 ft 7 in)
- Installed power: 2,800–3,200 PS (2,100–2,400 kW; 2,800–3,200 bhp) (diesels); 750 PS (550 kW; 740 shp) (electric)
- Propulsion: 2 shafts; 2 × diesel engines; 2 × electric motors
- Speed: 17.7 knots (32.8 km/h; 20.4 mph) surfaced; 7.6 knots (14.1 km/h; 8.7 mph) submerged
- Range: 8,500 nmi (15,700 km; 9,800 mi) at 10 knots (19 km/h; 12 mph) surfaced; 80 nmi (150 km; 92 mi) at 4 knots (7.4 km/h; 4.6 mph) submerged
- Test depth: 230 m (750 ft); Crush depth: 250–295 m (820–968 ft)
- Complement: 4 officers, 40–56 enlisted
- Armament: 5 × 53.3 cm (21 in) torpedo tubes (four bow, one stern); 14 × torpedoes or 26 TMA mines; 1 × 8.8 cm (3.46 in) deck gun (220 rounds); 1 x 2 cm (0.79 in) C/30 AA gun

Service record
- Part of: 8th U-boat Flotilla; 20 November 1941 – 30 June 1942; 1st U-boat Flotilla; 1 July – 12 October 1942
- Identification codes: M 42 993
- Commanders: K.Kapt. Eberhard Bobst; 20 November 1941 – 12 October 1942
- Operations: 2 patrols: 1st patrol: 27 June – 16 August 1942; 2nd patrol: 16 September – 12 October 1942
- Victories: None

German submarine U-597 was a Type VIIC U-boat of Nazi Germany's Kriegsmarine during World War II.

She was a member of eight wolfpacks, carried out two patrols but sank no ships.

She was sunk southwest of Iceland by a British aircraft on 12 October 1942.

== Design ==
German Type VIIC submarines were preceded by the shorter Type VIIB submarines. U-597 had a displacement of 769 tonnes (757 long tons) when at the surface and 871 tonnes (857 long tons) while submerged. She had a total length of 67.10 m (220 ft 2 in), a pressure hull length of 50.50 m (165 ft 8 in), a beam of 6.20 m (20 ft 4 in), a height of 9.60 m (31 ft 6 in), and a draught of 4.74 m (15 ft 7 in). The submarine was powered by two Germaniawerft F46 four-stroke, six-cylinder supercharged diesel engines producing a total of 2,800 to 3,200 metric horsepower (2,060 to 2,350 kW; 2,760 to 3,160 shp) for use while surfaced, two Brown, Boveri & Cie GG UB 720/8 double-acting electric motors producing a total of 750 metric horsepower (550 kW; 740 shp) for use while submerged. She had two shafts and two 1.23 m (4 ft) propellers. The boat was capable of operating at depths of up to 230 metres (750 ft).

The submarine had a maximum surface speed of 17.7 knots (32.8 km/h; 20.4 mph) and a maximum submerged speed of 7.6 knots (14.1 km/h; 8.7 mph). When submerged, the boat could operate for 80 nautical miles (150 km; 92 mi) at 4 knots (7.4 km/h; 4.6 mph); when surfaced, she could travel 8,500 nautical miles (15,700 km; 9,800 mi) at 10 knots (19 km/h; 12 mph). U-597 was fitted with five 53.3 cm (21 in) torpedo tubes (four fitted at the bow and one at the stern), fourteen torpedoes, one 8.8 cm (3.46 in) SK C/35 naval gun, 220 rounds, and a 2 cm (0.79 in) C/30 anti-aircraft gun. The boat had a complement of between forty-four and sixty.

== Service history ==
The submarine was laid down on 13 January 1941 at Blohm & Voss, Hamburg as yard number 573, launched on 1 October and commissioned on 20 November under the command of Kapitänleutnant Eberhard Bopst.

She served with the 8th U-boat Flotilla from 20 November 1941 for training and the 1st flotilla from 1 July 1942 for operations.

=== First patrol ===
U-597 departed Kiel on 27 June 1942 and headed for the Atlantic Ocean. Her route took her through the gap between Iceland and the Faroe Islands toward Newfoundland

She arrived in Brest in occupied France on 16 August.

=== Second patrol and loss ===
She departed Brest on 16 September and was sunk less than a month later on 12 October by depth charges dropped by a British B-24 Liberator of No. 120 Squadron RAF piloted by Squadron Leader Terry Bulloch.

Forty-nine men died in U-597; there were no survivors.

=== Wolfpacks ===
U-597 took part in eight wolfpacks, namely:

- Wolf (13 – 30 July 1942)
- Pirat (30 July – 3 August 1942)
- Steinbrinck (3 – 11 August 1942)
- Blitz (22 – 26 September 1942)
- Tiger (26 – 30 September 1942)
- Luchs (1 – 6 October 1942)
- Panther (6 – 12 October 1942)
- Leopard (12 October 1942)

== Bibliography ==
- Busch, Rainer; Röll, Hans-Joachim (1999). German U-boat commanders of World War II : a biographical dictionary. Translated by Brooks, Geoffrey. London, Annapolis, Md: Greenhill Books, Naval Institute Press. ISBN 1-55750-186-6.
- Busch, Rainer; Röll, Hans-Joachim (1999). Der U-Boot-Krieg, 1939-1945: Deutsche U-Boot-Verluste von September 1939 bis Mai 1945 [German U-boat losses from September 1939 to May 1945] (in German). Vol. IV. Hamburg, Berlin, Bonn: Mittler. ISBN 3-8132-0514-2.
- Edwards, Bernard (1996). Dönitz and the Wolf Packs - The U-boats at War. Cassell Military Classics. p. 91. ISBN 0-304-35203-9.
- Gröner, Eric; Jung, Dieter; Maass, Martin (1991). German Warships 1815-1945: U-boats and Mine Warfare Vessels. Vol. 2. Translated by Thomas, Keith; Magowan, Rachel. London: Conway Maritime Press. ISBN 0-85177-593-4.
- Kemp, Paul (1997). U-Boats Destroyed - German Submarine Losses in the World Wars. Arms & Armour. ISBN 1-85409-515-3.
