= German submarine U-607 =

German World War II submarine

History

Nazi Germany
- Name: U-607
- Ordered: 22 May 1940
- Builder: Blohm & Voss, Hamburg
- Yard number: 583
- Laid down: 27 March 1941
- Launched: 11 December 1941
- Commissioned: 29 January 1942
- Fate: Sunk by depth charges on 13 July 1943

General characteristics
- Class & type: Type VIIC submarine
- Displacement: 769 tonnes (757 long tons) surfaced; 871 t (857 long tons) submerged
- Length: 67.10 m (220 ft 2 in) o/a; 50.50 m (165 ft 8 in) pressure hull
- Beam: 6.20 m (20 ft 4 in) o/a; 4.70 m (15 ft 5 in) pressure hull
- Height: 9.60 m (31 ft 6 in)
- Draught: 4.74 m (15 ft 7 in)
- Installed power: 2,800–3,200 PS (2,100–2,400 kW; 2,800–3,200 bhp) (diesels); 750 PS (550 kW; 740 shp) (electric)
- Propulsion: 2 shafts; 2 × diesel engines; 2 × electric motors
- Speed: 17.7 knots (32.8 km/h; 20.4 mph) surfaced; 7.6 knots (14.1 km/h; 8.7 mph) submerged
- Range: 8,500 nmi (15,700 km; 9,800 mi) at 10 knots (19 km/h; 12 mph) surfaced; 80 nmi (150 km; 92 mi) at 4 knots (7.4 km/h; 4.6 mph) submerged
- Test depth: 230 m (750 ft); Crush depth: 250–295 m (820–968 ft)
- Complement: 4 officers, 40–56 enlisted
- Armament: 5 × 53.3 cm (21 in) torpedo tubes (four bow, one stern); 14 × torpedoes or 26 TMA mines; 1 × 8.8 cm (3.46 in) deck gun (220 rounds); 1 x 2 cm (0.79 in) C/30 AA gun

Service record
- Part of: 5th U-boat Flotilla; 29 January – 31 July 1942; 7th U-boat Flotilla; 1 August 1942 – 13 July 1943
- Identification codes: M 28 509
- Commanders: Kptlt. Ernst Mengersen; 29 January 1942 – 18 April 1943; Oblt.z.S. Wolf Jeschonnek; 18 April – 13 July 1943
- Operations: 5 patrols: 1st patrol: 13 July – 16 August 1942; 2nd patrol: 8 September – 23 October 1942; 3rd patrol: 2 January – 9 March 1943; 4th patrol: 24 April – 2 June 1943; 5th patrol: 10 – 13 July 1943
- Victories: 4 merchant ships sunk (28,937 GRT); 2 merchant ships damaged (15,201 GRT)

German submarine U-607 was a Type VIIC U-boat built for the Nazi Germany's Kriegsmarine for service during the Second World War. She was commissioned on 29 January 1942 and was sunk on 13 July 1943, having sunk four ships and damaged two others. Her commanders were Ernst Mengersen and Wolf Jeschonnek.

== Design ==
German Type VIIC submarines were preceded by the shorter Type VIIB submarines. U-607 had a displacement of 769 tonnes (757 long tons) when at the surface and 871 tonnes (857 long tons) while submerged. She had a total length of 67.10 m (220 ft 2 in), a pressure hull length of 50.50 m (165 ft 8 in), a beam of 6.20 m (20 ft 4 in), a height of 9.60 m (31 ft 6 in), and a draught of 4.74 m (15 ft 7 in). The submarine was powered by two Germaniawerft F46 four-stroke, six-cylinder supercharged diesel engines producing a total of 2,800 to 3,200 metric horsepower (2,060 to 2,350 kW; 2,760 to 3,160 shp) for use while surfaced, two Brown, Boveri & Cie GG UB 720/8 double-acting electric motors producing a total of 750 metric horsepower (550 kW; 740 shp) for use while submerged. She had two shafts and two 1.23 m (4 ft) propellers. The boat was capable of operating at depths of up to 230 metres (750 ft).

The submarine had a maximum surface speed of 17.7 knots (32.8 km/h; 20.4 mph) and a maximum submerged speed of 7.6 knots (14.1 km/h; 8.7 mph). When submerged, the boat could operate for 80 nautical miles (150 km; 92 mi) at 4 knots (7.4 km/h; 4.6 mph); when surfaced, she could travel 8,500 nautical miles (15,700 km; 9,800 mi) at 10 knots (19 km/h; 12 mph). U-607 was fitted with five 53.3 cm (21 in) torpedo tubes (four fitted at the bow and one at the stern), fourteen torpedoes, one 8.8 cm (3.46 in) SK C/35 naval gun, 220 rounds, and a 2 cm (0.79 in) C/30 anti-aircraft gun. The boat had a complement of between forty-four and sixty.

== Service history ==
U-607 was built by Blohm & Voss, Hamburg as yard number 583. She was ordered on 22 May 1940 and her keel was laid on 27 March 1941. U-607 was launched on 11 December 1941.

=== Under Mengersen ===
U-607 was commissioned into the Kriegsmarine on 29 January, and entered 5th U-boat Flotilla based at Kiel under the command of Ernst Mengersen as a boat under training. In August 1942, U-607 completed her training and transferred to 7th U-boat Flotilla based at St Nazaire, France as an operational boat.

==== First patrol ====
On 13 July, U-607 departed Kristiansand on active patrol. During the patrol she sank one ship and damaged another, breaking off the attack after depth charges were dropped. She returned to Kristiansand on 16 August. U-607 then sailed to St Nazaire.

==== Second patrol ====
On 8 September, U-607 departed St Nazaire on active patrol, returning on 23 October. During the patrol she sank one ship. On 23 September, U-607 was rammed by a destroyer and slightly damaged. U-607 suffered heavy damage when she attacked Convoy SC 104 On 11 October. Fourteen depth charges were fired by HMS Viscount, firstly at a 150 feet (46 m) and again at 400 feet (120 m). The boat descended to a depth of 600 feet (180 m) before she could be brought under control. The badly damaged boat was brought to the surface, evading detection as it was night. U-607 had suffered damage to her communication systems, depth gauges, depth rudder, engines and rudder. It took some time to make temporary repairs. Leutnant (Ing.) (Engineering Lieutenant) Russ openly quarrelled with Mengersen over the incident, which was witnessed by some of the ship's crew and a propaganda photographer who was on board. On returning to St Nazaire, Russ was court-Martialled and found guilty of insubordination. He was dismissed from the Kriegsmarine and sentenced to eight months fortress confinement and four months imprisonment. U-607 took six weeks to repair at St Nazaire.

==== Third Patrol ====
On 2 January 1943, U-607 departed St Nazaire on active patrol, returning on 9 March. During the patrol she sank one ship and damaged another.

=== Under Jeschonnek ===
==== Fourth patrol ====
On 24 April 1943, U-607 departed St Nazaire on active patrol under the command of Oberleutnant zur See Wolf Jeschonnek. Jeschonnek had served on U-607 since her commissioning. During the patrol she was attacked on a number of occasions. On 28 April she was attacked by a Vickers Wellington aircraft of 172 Squadron, Royal Air Force. On 12 May she was attacked by a Fairey Swordfish of 811 Squadron, Fleet Air Arm. After this, she was hunted by a Royal Navy corvette which opened fire at extreme range without effect. She was forced to submerge when one of her diesel engines broke down. Over a seven-hour period a number of depth charges were dropped without effect. U-607 managed to surface a couple of times and was forced to dive again. The third time she surfaced there was an area of mist and she was able to make her escape.

On 15 May, U-607 attacked SS Irish Oak, a neutral Irish merchant ship some 850 nautical miles (1,570 km; 980 mi) west of Ushant. Jeschennek claimed that Irish Oak was a Q-ship, steaming at 14 knots (26 km/h; 16 mph) without lights. Irish Oak had large Tricolours painted on her sides with the word EIRE in large letters. Two torpedoes were fired and the ship slowly sank by the bow. Around 60 crew were seen to leave the ship. U-607 returned to St Nazaire on 2 June. During her time in St Nazaire after this patrol, extra anti-aircraft armament was fitted.

==== Fifth patrol and loss ====
On 10 July 1943, U-607 departed St Nazaire on active patrol. Her orders were to lay mines off Kingston, Jamaica, with explicit orders not to attack any convoys encountered. U-607 was to proceed in convoy with three other U-boats, although one of these put back to St Nazaire with defects. The submarines were submerged at night and sailed on the surface during daytime. Just after midnight on 13 July, a bottle of Champagne was opened to toast Jeschonnek's birthday. U-607 surfaced at about 07:55 German time and was spotted by Sunderland, DQ-N, of 228 Squadron, Royal Air Force and then by Halifax, BY-O, of 58 Squadron, Royal Air Force.

Wishing to present as small a target as possible, U-607 turned away from the Halifax. This meant that she was becoming increasingly further from the other two U-boats. The three U-boats opened fire on the aircraft. The aircraft successfully managed to split the fire of the U-boats, which ceased firing after a while. U-607 attempted to rejoin the other two U-boats but during this manoeuvre she was attacked by the Sunderland which dropped seven 250-pound (110 kg) depth charges set to detonate at 25 feet (7.6 m). The depth charges were dropped from an altitude of 50 feet (15 m) and the Sunderland had to take evasive action to avoid a collision with the conning tower of U-607.

The depth charges straddled U-607 from port quarter to starboard bow. Their detonation broke her in two, with the bow section rising over vertical and sinking while the stern section capsized then sank. Twenty-five survivors were seen in the water and the Sunderland dropped a dinghy. Seven of the crew managed to climb aboard. Only these seven of the 51 crew survived. U-607 was sunk at 45°02′N 9°14′W. Although ships of the Second Support Group passed close by, the survivors were not picked up as no ship could be spared for the task. A flight of Junkers Ju 88 aircraft flew over at an altitude to 10,000 feet (3,000 m) apparently without spotting the survivors. At 04:00 local time on 14 July, the survivors were found at 44°50′N 08°50′W by HMS Wren and a boat was despatched to rescue them. The survivors were asked the number of their boat, which at first they refused to divulge. When told that they would not be rescued without divulging this information, Oberleutnant zur See Jeschonnek called the boat back and gave the information required.

=== Wolfpacks ===
U-607 took part in twelve wolfpacks, namely:

- Wolf (25 – 30 July 1942)
- Pirat (30 July – 3 August 1942)
- Steinbrinck (3 – 10 August 1942)
- Pfeil (12 – 22 September 1942)
- Blitz (22 – 26 September 1942)
- Tiger (26 – 30 September 1942)
- Wotan (5 – 16 October 1942)
- Falke (8 – 19 January 1943)
- Haudegen (19 January – 15 February 1943)
- Drossel (29 April – 15 May 1943)
- Oder (17 – 19 May 1943)
- Mosel (19 – 23 May 1943)

== Summary of raiding history ==
Date	Ship Name	Nationality	Tonnage (GRT)	Fate
26 July 1942	Empire Rainbow	United Kingdom	6,942	Damaged
4 August 1942	Belgian Soldier	Belgium	7,167	Sunk
14 October 1942	Nellie	Greece	4,826	Sunk
26 January 1943	Kollbjørg	Norway	8,259	Damaged
15 February 1943	Atlantic Sun	United States	11,355	Sunk
15 May 1943	Irish Oak	Ireland	5,589	Sunk

== Bibliography ==
- Busch, Rainer; Röll, Hans-Joachim (1999). German U-boat commanders of World War II : a biographical dictionary. Translated by Brooks, Geoffrey. London, Annapolis, Md: Greenhill Books, Naval Institute Press. ISBN 1-55750-186-6.
- Busch, Rainer; Röll, Hans-Joachim (1999). Der U-Boot-Krieg, 1939-1945: Deutsche U-Boot-Verluste von September 1939 bis Mai 1945 [German U-boat losses from September 1939 to May 1945] (in German). Vol. IV. Hamburg, Berlin, Bonn: Mittler. ISBN 3-8132-0514-2.
- Edwards, Bernard (1996). Dönitz and the Wolf Packs - The U-boats at War. Cassell Military Classics. pp. 75, 83, 85, 151. ISBN 0-304-35203-9.
- Gröner, Eric; Jung, Dieter; Maass, Martin (1991). German Warships 1815-1945: U-boats and Mine Warfare Vessels. Vol. 2. Translated by Thomas, Keith; Magowan, Rachel. London: Conway Maritime Press. ISBN 0-85177-593-4.
