= German submarine U-712 =

German World War II submarine

History

Nazi Germany
- Name: U-712
- Ordered: 7 December 1940
- Builder: HC Stülcken & Sohn, Hamburg
- Yard number: 778
- Laid down: 4 September 1941
- Launched: 10 August 1942
- Commissioned: 5 November 1942
- Fate: Surrendered to Allied forces on 9 May 1945; Scrapped in 1950

General characteristics
- Class & type: Type VIIC submarine
- Displacement: 769 tonnes (757 long tons) surfaced; 871 t (857 long tons) submerged
- Length: 67.10 m (220 ft 2 in) o/a; 50.50 m (165 ft 8 in) pressure hull
- Beam: 6.20 m (20 ft 4 in) o/a; 4.70 m (15 ft 5 in) pressure hull
- Height: 9.60 m (31 ft 6 in)
- Draught: 4.74 m (15 ft 7 in)
- Installed power: 2,800–3,200 PS (2,100–2,400 kW; 2,800–3,200 bhp) (diesels); 750 PS (550 kW; 740 shp) (electric)
- Propulsion: 2 shafts; 2 × diesel engines; 2 × electric motors
- Speed: 17.7 knots (32.8 km/h; 20.4 mph) surfaced; 7.6 knots (14.1 km/h; 8.7 mph) submerged
- Range: 8,500 nmi (15,700 km; 9,800 mi) at 10 knots (19 km/h; 12 mph) surfaced; 80 nmi (150 km; 92 mi) at 4 knots (7.4 km/h; 4.6 mph) submerged
- Test depth: 230 m (750 ft); Crush depth: 250–295 m (820–968 ft)
- Complement: 4 officers, 40–56 enlisted
- Armament: 5 × 53.3 cm (21 in) torpedo tubes (four bow, one stern); 14 × torpedoes; 1 × 8.8 cm (3.46 in) deck gun (220 rounds); 2 × twin 2 cm (0.79 in) C/30 anti-aircraft guns

Service record
- Part of: 8th U-boat Flotilla; 5 November 1942 – 31 October 1943; 3rd U-boat Flotilla; 1 November – 31 December 1943; 21st U-boat Flotilla; 1 January 1944 – 28 February 1945; 31st U-boat Flotilla; 1 March – 8 May 1945
- Identification codes: M 50 836
- Commanders: Oblt.z.S. Walter Pietschmann; 5 November 1942 – 14 December 1943; Oblt.z.S. Walter-Ernst Koch; 15 December 1943 – 2 July 1944; Oblt.z.S. Freiherr Eberhard von Ketelhodt; 3 July 1944 – 9 May 1945
- Operations: None
- Victories: None

German submarine U-712 was a Type VIIC U-boat built for Nazi Germany's Kriegsmarine for service during World War II. Commissioned on 5 November 1942, she served with the 8th U-boat Flotilla until 31 October 1943 as a training boat, and as a front boat in the 3rd U-boat Flotilla under Oberleutnant zur See Walter Pietschmann until 14 December, before being replaced by Oberleutnant zur See Walter-Ernst Koch.

== Design ==
German Type VIIC submarines were preceded by the shorter Type VIIB submarines. U-712 had a displacement of 769 tonnes (757 long tons) when at the surface and 871 tonnes (857 long tons) while submerged. She had a total length of 67.10 m (220 ft 2 in), a pressure hull length of 50.50 m (165 ft 8 in), a beam of 6.20 m (20 ft 4 in), a height of 9.60 m (31 ft 6 in), and a draught of 4.74 m (15 ft 7 in). The submarine was powered by two Germaniawerft F46 four-stroke, six-cylinder supercharged diesel engines producing a total of 2,800 to 3,200 metric horsepower (2,060 to 2,350 kW; 2,760 to 3,160 shp) for use while surfaced, two AEG GU 460/8–27 double-acting electric motors producing a total of 750 metric horsepower (550 kW; 740 shp) for use while submerged. She had two shafts and two 1.23 m (4 ft) propellers. The boat was capable of operating at depths of up to 230 metres (750 ft).

The submarine had a maximum surface speed of 17.7 knots (32.8 km/h; 20.4 mph) and a maximum submerged speed of 7.6 knots (14.1 km/h; 8.7 mph). When submerged, the boat could operate for 80 nautical miles (150 km; 92 mi) at 4 knots (7.4 km/h; 4.6 mph); when surfaced, she could travel 8,500 nautical miles (15,700 km; 9,800 mi) at 10 knots (19 km/h; 12 mph). U-712 was fitted with five 53.3 cm (21 in) torpedo tubes (four fitted at the bow and one at the stern), fourteen torpedoes, one 8.8 cm (3.46 in) SK C/35 naval gun, 220 rounds, and two twin 2 cm (0.79 in) C/30 anti-aircraft guns. The boat had a complement of between forty-four and sixty.

== Service history ==
Built as yard number 778 at the HC Stülcken & Sohn shipyard in Hamburg, U-712 was launched on 10 August 1942. After the completion of system checks and crew training, U-712 was transferred to the 3rd Flotilla on 1 November 1943. On 1 January 1944, she was reassigned to the 21st U-boat Flotilla as a training boat. On 3 July 1944, Oberleutnant zur See Koch handed over to Freiherr Eberhard von Ketelhodt, leaving to command U-975. U-712's purpose was succeeded by a similar function with the 31st from 1 March 1945.

In the rest of her career under Walter-Ernst Koch and Freiherr Eberhard von Ketelhodt, she served as a training vessel, never having made a single patrol.

== Fate ==
After Germany's surrender in May 1945, U-712 was surrendered at Kristiansand on 9 May 1945 in Norway. She was later taken to Loch Ryan in Scotland, where the British used her bulk for testing before breaking her up at Hayle in 1950.

== Bibliography ==
- Busch, Rainer; Röll, Hans-Joachim (1999). German U-boat commanders of World War II : a biographical dictionary. Translated by Brooks, Geoffrey. London, Annapolis, Md: Greenhill Books, Naval Institute Press. ISBN 1-55750-186-6.
- Busch, Rainer; Röll, Hans-Joachim (1999). Der U-Boot-Krieg, 1939-1945: Deutsche U-Boot-Verluste von September 1939 bis Mai 1945 [German U-boat losses from September 1939 to May 1945] (in German). Vol. IV. Hamburg, Berlin, Bonn: Mittler. ISBN 3-8132-0514-2.
- Gröner, Eric; Jung, Dieter; Maass, Martin (1991). German Warships 1815-1945: U-boats and Mine Warfare Vessels. Vol. 2. Translated by Thomas, Keith; Magowan, Rachel. London: Conway Maritime Press. ISBN 0-85177-593-4.
