= German submarine U-291 =

German World War II submarine

Coordinates: 55°50′N 9°08′W

History

Nazi Germany
- Name: U-291
- Ordered: 5 June 1941
- Builder: Bremer Vulkan, Bremen-Vegesack
- Yard number: 56
- Laid down: 17 October 1942
- Launched: 30 June 1943
- Commissioned: 4 August 1943
- Fate: Surrendered on 5 May 1945; Sunk by HMS Onslaught off Northern Ireland on 20 December 1945

General characteristics
- Class & type: Type VIIC submarine
- Displacement: 769 tonnes (757 long tons) surfaced; 871 t (857 long tons) submerged
- Length: 67.10 m (220 ft 2 in) o/a; 50.50 m (165 ft 8 in) pressure hull
- Beam: 6.20 m (20 ft 4 in) o/a; 4.70 m (15 ft 5 in) pressure hull
- Height: 9.60 m (31 ft 6 in)
- Draught: 4.74 m (15 ft 7 in)
- Installed power: 2,800–3,200 PS (2,100–2,400 kW; 2,800–3,200 bhp) (diesels); 750 PS (550 kW; 740 shp) (electric)
- Propulsion: 2 shafts; 2 × diesel engines; 2 × electric motors
- Speed: 17.7 knots (32.8 km/h; 20.4 mph) surfaced; 7.6 knots (14.1 km/h; 8.7 mph) submerged
- Range: 8,500 nmi (15,700 km; 9,800 mi) at 10 knots (19 km/h; 12 mph) surfaced; 80 nmi (150 km; 92 mi) at 4 knots (7.4 km/h; 4.6 mph) submerged
- Test depth: 230 m (750 ft); Crush depth: 250–295 m (820–968 ft)
- Complement: 4 officers, 40–56 enlisted
- Armament: 5 × 53.3 cm (21 in) torpedo tubes (four bow, one stern); 14 × torpedoes or 26 TMA mines; 1 × 3.7 cm (1.5 in) Flak M42 AA gun; 2 × twin 2 cm (0.79 in) C/30 anti-aircraft guns

Service record
- Part of: 21st U-boat Flotilla; 4 – 31 August 1943; 23rd U-boat Flotilla; 1 September 1943 – 1 July 1944; 21st U-boat Flotilla; 1 July 1944 – 28 February 1945; 31st U-boat Flotilla; 1 March – 5 May 1945
- Identification codes: M 53 159
- Commanders: Lt.z.S. / Oblt.z.S. Hans Keerl; 4 August – 30 September 1943; Oblt.z.S. Friedrich Stege; 1 October 1943 – 16 July 1944; Oblt.z.S. Hermann Neumeister; 17 July 1944 – 5 May 1945
- Operations: None
- Victories: None

German submarine U-291 was a Type VIIC U-boat of Nazi Germany's Kriegsmarine during World War II.

The submarine was laid down on 17 October 1942 at the Bremer Vulkan yard at Bremen-Vegesack as yard number 56. She was launched on 30 June 1943 and commissioned on 4 August under the command of Oberleutnant zur See Hans Keerle.

She carried out no patrols and did not sink or damage any ships.

The boat surrendered on 5 May 1945 at Cuxhaven. She was sunk as part of Operation Deadlight on 20 December 1945.

== Design ==
German Type VIIC submarines were preceded by the shorter Type VIIB submarines. U-291 had a displacement of 769 tonnes (757 long tons) when at the surface and 871 tonnes (857 long tons) while submerged. She had a total length of 67.10 m (220 ft 2 in), a pressure hull length of 50.50 m (165 ft 8 in), a beam of 6.20 m (20 ft 4 in), a height of 9.60 m (31 ft 6 in), and a draught of 4.74 m (15 ft 7 in). The submarine was powered by two Germaniawerft F46 four-stroke, six-cylinder supercharged diesel engines producing a total of 2,800 to 3,200 metric horsepower (2,060 to 2,350 kW; 2,760 to 3,160 shp) for use while surfaced, two AEG GU 460/8–27 double-acting electric motors producing a total of 750 metric horsepower (550 kW; 740 shp) for use while submerged. She had two shafts and two 1.23 m (4 ft) propellers. The boat was capable of operating at depths of up to 230 metres (750 ft).

The submarine had a maximum surface speed of 17.7 knots (32.8 km/h; 20.4 mph) and a maximum submerged speed of 7.6 knots (14.1 km/h; 8.7 mph). When submerged, the boat could operate for 80 nautical miles (150 km; 92 mi) at 4 knots (7.4 km/h; 4.6 mph); when surfaced, she could travel 8,500 nautical miles (15,700 km; 9,800 mi) at 10 knots (19 km/h; 12 mph). U-291 was fitted with five 53.3 cm (21 in) torpedo tubes (four fitted at the bow and one at the stern), fourteen torpedoes, one 3.7 cm (1.5 in) Flak M42 and two twin 2 cm (0.79 in) C/30 anti-aircraft guns. The boat had a complement of between forty-four and sixty.

== Service history ==
U-291 served with the 21st U-boat Flotilla for training from 4 to 31 August 1943 and was a Trials boat with the 23rd flotilla from 1 September 1943 until 1 July 1944. She then worked as a 'school' boat from 1 July 1944 to 28 February 1945 with the 21st flotilla once more. Her last assignment was with the 31st flotilla from 1 March to 8 May 1945.

The submarine capitulated at Cuxhaven on 5 May 1945. She was transferred from Wilhelmshaven to Loch Ryan in Scotland for Operation Deadlight on 24 June and was sunk by the guns of HMS Onslaught off Northern Ireland on 20 December 1945.

== Bibliography ==
- Busch, Rainer; Röll, Hans-Joachim (1999). German U-boat commanders of World War II : a biographical dictionary. Translated by Brooks, Geoffrey. London, Annapolis, Md: Greenhill Books, Naval Institute Press. ISBN 1-55750-186-6.
- Busch, Rainer; Röll, Hans-Joachim (1999). Deutsche U-Boot-Verluste von September 1939 bis Mai 1945 [German U-boat losses from September 1939 to May 1945]. Der U-Boot-Krieg (in German). Vol. IV. Hamburg, Berlin, Bonn: Mittler. ISBN 3-8132-0514-2.
- Gröner, Erich; Jung, Dieter; Maass, Martin (1991). U-boats and Mine Warfare Vessels. German Warships 1815–1945. Vol. 2. Translated by Thomas, Keith; Magowan, Rachel. London: Conway Maritime Press. ISBN 0-85177-593-4.
