= 21st U-boat Flotilla =

21st U-boat Flotilla: 21. Unterseebootsflottille
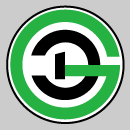
- Active: 1935—1945
- Disbanded: 1945
- Country: Nazi Germany
- Branch: Kriegsmarine
- Type: U-boat flotilla
- Engagements: World War II

21st U-boat Flotilla ("21. Unterseebootsflottille") was a unit of Nazi Germany's Kriegsmarine before and during World War II. It was formed in 1935 as a Schulverband ("School Unit") based at Kiel under the command of Kapitän zur See Kurt Slevogt (Chef des Schulverbandes).

In May 1937 the unit moved to Neustadt and was redesignated as the Unterseebootsschulflottille, ("U-boat School Flotilla"), commanded by Kapitänleutnant Heinz Beduhn.

In June 1940 it was redesignated 21. Unterseebootsflottille, and in July 1941 the flotilla moved bases to Pillau. The flotilla was disbanded in March 1945.

== Flotilla commanders ==
- Kapitän zur See Kurt Slevogt (1935–1937)
- Kapitänleutnant Heinz Beduhn (November 1937—March 1940)
- Korvettenkapitän Paul Büchel (March 1940—June 1943)
- Korvettenkapitän Otto Schuhart (June 1943—September 1944)
- Kapitänleutnant Herwig Collmann (September 1944—March 1945)

== Assigned U-boats ==
Fifty-one U-boats were assigned to this flotilla during its service.

- U-2
- U-3
- U-4
- U-5
- U-6
- U-7
- U-9
- U-10
- U-11
- U-20
- U-21
- U-23
- U-24
- U-29
- U-34
- U-38
- U-48
- U-60
- U-61
- U-62
- U-72
- U-80
- U-101
- U-120
- U-121
- U-139
- U-141
- U-148
- U-151
- U-152
- U-236
- U-251
- U-291
- U-368
- U-416
- U-430
- U-555
- U-704
- U-708
- U-712
- U-720
- U-733
- U-746
- U-922
- U-977
- U-1195
- U-1196
- U-1197
- U-1198
- U-1201
- U-1204
