= German submarine U-6 (1935) =

German World War II submarine

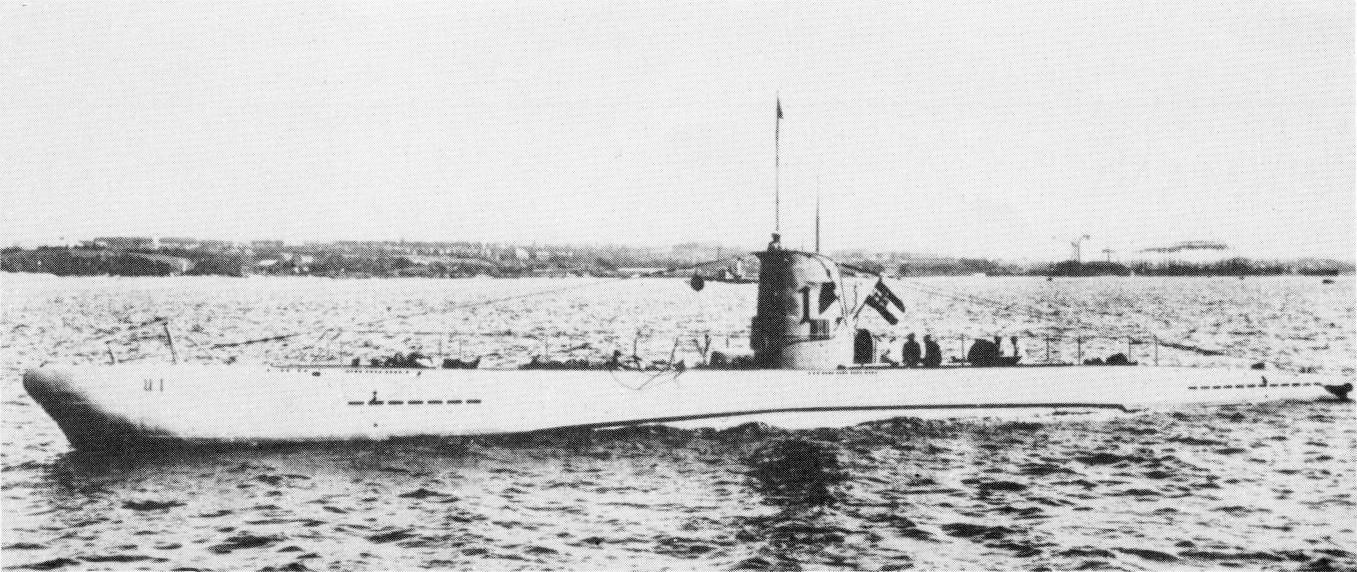
- U-1, the first Type II boat

History

Nazi Germany
- Name: U-6
- Ordered: 2 February 1935
- Builder: Deutsche Werke, Kiel
- Cost: 1,500,000 Reichsmark
- Yard number: 241
- Laid down: 11 February 1935
- Launched: 21 August 1935
- Commissioned: 7 September 1935
- Decommissioned: 7 August 1944 at Gotenhafen
- Fate: Stricken, 7 August 1944; scuttled with explosives, May, 1945

General characteristics
- Class & type: Type IIA coastal submarine
- Displacement: 254 t (250 long tons) surfaced; 303 t (298 long tons) submerged; 381 t (375 long tons) total
- Length: 40.90 m (134 ft 2 in) (o/a); 27.80 m (91 ft 2 in) (pressure hull)
- Beam: 4.08 m (13 ft 5 in) (o/a); 4.00 m (13 ft 1 in) (pressure hull)
- Height: 8.60 m (28 ft 3 in)
- Draught: 3.83 m (12 ft 7 in)
- Installed power: 700 PS (510 kW; 690 shp) (diesels); 360 PS (260 kW; 360 shp) (electric)
- Propulsion: 2 × propeller shafts; 2 × 0.85 m (2 ft 9 in) three-bladed propellers; 2 × diesel engines; 2 × double-acting electric motors
- Speed: 13 knots (24 km/h; 15 mph) surfaced; 6.9 knots (12.8 km/h; 7.9 mph) submerged
- Range: 1,050 nmi (1,940 km; 1,210 mi) at 12 knots (22 km/h; 14 mph) surfaced; 35 nmi (65 km; 40 mi) at 4 knots (7.4 km/h; 4.6 mph) submerged
- Test depth: 80 m (260 ft)
- Complement: 3 officers, 22 men
- Armament: 3 × 53.3 cm (21 in) torpedo tubes; 5 × torpedoes or up to 12 TMA or 18 TMB mines; 1 × 2 cm (0.79 in) C/30 anti-aircraft gun

Service record
- Part of: U-boat School Flotilla; 1 September 1935 – 1 September 1939; 1 October 1939 – 1 February 1940; 1 March – 1 April 1940; 1 May – 30 June 1940; 21st U-boat Flotilla; 1 July 1940 - 7 August 1944
- Identification codes: M 00 130
- Commanders: Oblt.z.S. / Kptlt. Ludwig Mathes; 7 September 1935 – 30 September 1937; Oblt.z.S. Werner Heidel; 1 October 1937 – 17 December 1938; Oblt.z.S. / Kptlt.Joachim Matz; 17 December 1938 – 26 November 1939; Oblt.z.S. Hans-Bernhard Michalowski; November – December 1939; Oblt.z.S. Otto Harms; 27 November 1939 – 17 January 1940; Oblt.z.S. Adalbert Schnee; 31 January – 10 July 1940; Kptlt.Georg Peters; June – July 1940; Oblt.z.S. Johannes Liebe; 11 July 1940 – March 1941; Oblt.z.S. / Kptlt. Eberhard Bopst; March – September 1941; Herbert Brüninghaus; October 1941 – August 1942; Oblt.z.S. Paul Just; August – September 1942; Oblt.z.S. Herbert Brüninghaus; September – 19 October 1942; Lt.z.S. / Oblt.z.S. Otto Niethmann; 20 October 1942 – June 1943; Lt.z.S. / Oblt.z.S. Alois König; June 1943 – 16 April 1944; Lt.z.S. Horst Heitz; August – October 1943; Lt.z.S. Erwin Jestel; 17 April – 9 July 1944
- Operations: 2 patrols: 1st patrol: 24 August – 13 September 1939; 2nd patrol: 4 – 19 Apr 1940
- Victories: No ships sunk or damaged

The German submarine U-6 was a long-lived but very inactive Type IIA U-boat built before World War II for service in Nazi Germany's Kriegsmarine.

As she was one of the first batch of boats built following the renunciation of the Treaty of Versailles, she was capable of only coastal and short cruising work. This led to her being reassigned to training duties after the Norwegian campaign in 1940.

== Design ==
German Type II submarines were based on the Finnish submarine Vesikko. U-6 had a displacement of 254 tonnes (250 long tons) when at the surface and 303 tonnes (298 long tons) while submerged. Officially, the standard tonnage was 250 long tons (250 t), however. The U-boat had a total length of 40.90 m (134 ft 2 in), a pressure hull length of 27.80 m (91 ft 2 in), a beam of 4.08 m (13 ft 5 in), a height of 8.60 m (28 ft 3 in), and a draught of 3.83 m (12 ft 7 in). The submarine was powered by two MWM RS 127 S four-stroke, six-cylinder diesel engines of 700 metric horsepower (510 kW; 690 shp) for cruising, two Siemens-Schuckert PG VV 322/36 double-acting electric motors producing a total of 360 metric horsepower (260 kW; 360 shp) for use while submerged. She had two shafts and two 0.85 m (3 ft) propellers. The boat was capable of operating at depths of up to 80–150 metres (260–490 ft).

The submarine had a maximum surface speed of 13 knots (24 km/h; 15 mph) and a maximum submerged speed of 6.9 knots (12.8 km/h; 7.9 mph). When submerged, the boat could operate for 35 nautical miles (65 km; 40 mi) at 4 knots (7.4 km/h; 4.6 mph); when surfaced, she could travel 1,600 nautical miles (3,000 km; 1,800 mi) at 8 knots (15 km/h; 9.2 mph). U-6 was fitted with three 53.3 cm (21 in) torpedo tubes at the bow, five torpedoes or up to twelve Type A torpedo mines, and a 2 cm (0.79 in) anti-aircraft gun. The boat had a complement of 25.

== Service history ==
Built at Kiel in 1935, U-6 was a prestigious position for a captain in the Kriegsmarine during the years running up to the war, her commanders were all First World War veterans. On 31 August 1939, before the outbreak of World War II, the U-6 spotted three destroyers of the Polish Navy, the Burza, Błyskawica, and Grom, executing Peking Plan, on their way to Great Britain, but no action was undertaken. However, once war began, it was painfully clear that U-6 and her sisters were not capable of competing with other nations' larger and faster boats, and so after an initial patrol in the Baltic Sea, U-6 was not deployed again until March 1940, when every ship available to the Kriegsmarine was sent to support the invasion of Norway. During the month-long campaign, U-6's sister boats suffered numerous losses, and gained a reputation as something of a liability, which led them to be withdrawn to a training squadron in the Baltic for the remainder of the war.

In the Baltic, U-6 trained officer cadets in the skills needed to fight in the Battle of the Atlantic. Some of her patrols even verged on Soviet territory following Operation Barbarossa but, unlike some of her sister boats, U-6 never found a target on these missions. In the summer of 1944, with fuel and resources in short supply and the reputation of the Type II boats plummeting following a number of fatal accidents, U-6 was removed from service and laid up at Gotenhafen with a skeleton crew to perform maintenance. There she remained until May 1945, when a demolition team blew her up at her berth to prevent her falling into enemy hands.

== Bibliography ==
- Busch, Rainer; Röll, Hans-Joachim (1999). German U-boat commanders of World War II : a biographical dictionary. Translated by Brooks, Geoffrey. London, Annapolis, Md: Greenhill Books, Naval Institute Press. ISBN 1-55750-186-6.
- Gröner, Eric; Jung, Dieter; Maass, Martin (1991). German Warships 1815-1945: U-boats and Mine Warfare Vessels. Vol. 2. Translated by Thomas, Keith; Magowan, Rachel. London: Conway Maritime Press. ISBN 0-85177-593-4.
- Sharpe, Peter (1998). U-Boat Fact File. Great Britain: Midland Publishing. ISBN 1-85780-072-9.
