= Eberhard Bopst =

World War II German U-boat commander

- Born: 25 December 1913; Berlin-Charlottenburg, German Empire
- Died: 12 October 1942 (aged 28); North Atlantic Ocean
- Military career
- Allegiance: Nazi Germany
- Branch: Reichsmarine; Kriegsmarine
- Service years: 1933–1942
- Rank: Korvettenkapitän
- Commands: U-6; U-597
- Conflicts: Spanish Civil War World War II: Battles of Narvik
- Awards: Four Year Wehrmacht Long Service Award, Spanish Cross in Silver without Swords, Iron Cross 2nd Class, Destroyer War Badge, Narvik Shield, Iron Cross 1st Class

Eberhard Bopst (25 December 1913 – 12 October 1942) was a German U-boat commander in World War II.

== Naval career ==
Eberhard Bopst joined the Reichsmarine in April 1933 and prior to transferring to the U-boat section served on the destroyers Georg Thiele (as 3rd Watch Officer, 1936–1937), Leberecht Maass (1937–1938) and Bernd von Arnim (December 1938 – 1940). On Bernd von Arnim he saw action in the Spanish Civil War, receiving the Spanish Cross in Silver without Swords, and at the Battles of Narvik, receiving the Narvik Shield. After the Norwegian Campaign he returned to Germany, joining the U-boat arm in July 1940. His first command was U-6, a Type IIA coastal boat, but he commissioned the Type VIIC U-597 in November 1941. He went down with her when she was sunk with all hands in position 56°50′N 28°05′W, by depth charges from an RAF Liberator on 12 October 1942. Bopst was posthumously promoted to Korvettenkapitän.

== Awards ==
- Four Year Wehrmacht Long Service Award - March 1937
- Spanish Cross in Silver without Swords - 6 June 1939
- Iron Cross 2nd Class - November 1939
- Destroyer War Badge - April 1940
- Narvik Shield - April 1940
- Iron Cross 1st Class - August 1941

== Bibliography ==
- Busch, Rainer; Röll, Hans-Joachim (1999). German U-boat commanders of World War II : a biographical dictionary. Translated by Brooks, Geoffrey. London, Annapolis, Md: Greenhill Books, Naval Institute Press. ISBN 1-55750-186-6.

Military offices
Preceded by Kapitänleutnant Johannes Liebe	Commanding officer, U-6; March 1941 – September 1941	Succeeded by Kapitänleutnant Herbert Brüninghaus
First	Commanding officer, U-597; 20 November 1941 – 12 October 1942	Ship sunk
