= SS Irish Oak =

Irish Shipping Ltd operated two steamships with the name Irish Oak:

- SS Irish Oak (1919)
- SS Irish Oak (1949)
