= List of Type XXI submarines =

This is a complete list of German Type XXI submarines. Fifteen hundred boats of this design were intended (U-2501 to U-4000), the first five hundred ordered from Deutsche Werft at Hamburg, another five hundred from AG Weser at Bremen, and a final five hundred from Schichau at Danzig, but only those listed below were completed, and most that did never saw service and were scuttled.

- U-2501
- U-2502
- U-2503
- U-2504
- U-2505
- U-2506
- U-2507
- U-2508
- U-2509
- U-2510
- U-2511
- U-2512
- U-2513
- U-2514
- U-2515
- U-2516
- U-2517
- U-2518
- U-2519
- U-2520
- U-2521
- U-2522
- U-2523
- U-2524
- U-2525
- U-2526
- U-2527
- U-2528
- U-2529
- U-2530
- U-2531
- U-2533
- U-2534
- U-2535
- U-2536
- U-2538
- U-2539
- U-2540
- U-2541
- U-2542
- U-2543
- U-2544
- U-2545
- U-2546
- U-2548
- U-2551
- U-2552
- U-3001
- U-3002
- U-3003
- U-3004
- U-3005
- U-3006
- U-3007
- U-3008
- U-3009
- U-3010
- U-3011
- U-3012
- U-3013
- U-3014
- U-3015
- U-3016
- U-3017
- U-3018
- U-3019
- U-3020
- U-3021
- U-3022
- U-3023
- U-3024
- U-3025
- U-3026
- U-3027
- U-3028
- U-3029
- U-3030
- U-3031
- U-3032
- U-3033
- U-3034
- U-3035
- U-3037
- U-3038
- U-3039
- U-3040
- U-3041
- U-3044
- U-3501
- U-3502
- U-3503
- U-3504
- U-3505
- U-3506
- U-3507
- U-3508
- U-3509
- U-3510
- U-3511
- U-3512
- U-3513
- U-3514
- U-3515
- U-3516
- U-3517
- U-3518
- U-3519
- U-3520
- U-3521
- U-3522
- U-3523
- U-3524
- U-3525
- U-3526
- U-3527
- U-3528
- U-3529
- U-3530
