= German submarine U-3021 =

German World War II submarine

History

Nazi Germany
- Name: U-3021
- Ordered: 6 November 1943
- Builder: AG Weser, Bremen
- Yard number: 1180
- Laid down: 26 September 1944
- Launched: 27 November 1944
- Commissioned: 12 January 1945
- Fate: Scuttled on 2 May 1945

General characteristics
- Class & type: Type XXI submarine
- Displacement: 1,621 t (1,595 long tons) surfaced; 1,819 t (1,790 long tons) submerged
- Length: 76.70 m (251 ft 8 in) (o/a); 60.50 m (198 ft 6 in) (p/h)
- Beam: 8 m (26 ft 3 in) (o/a); 5.3 m (17 ft 5 in) (p/h)
- Height: 11.30 m (37 ft 1 in)
- Draught: 6.32 m (20 ft 9 in)
- Installed power: 4,000 PS (2,900 kW; 3,900 shp) (diesel drive); 5,000 PS (3,700 kW; 4,900 shp) (standard electric drive); 226 PS (166 kW; 223 shp) (silent electric drive)
- Propulsion: Diesel/Electric; 2 × MAN M6V40/46KBB supercharged 6-cylinder diesel engines; 2 × SSW GU365/30 double-acting electric motors; 2 × SSW GV232/28 silent running electric motors
- Speed: Surfaced: 15.6 knots (28.9 km/h; 18.0 mph) (diesel); 17.9 knots (33.2 km/h; 20.6 mph) (electric); Submerged: 17.2 knots (31.9 km/h; 19.8 mph) (electric); 6.1 knots (11.3 km/h; 7.0 mph) (silent running motors)
- Range: 15,500 nmi (28,700 km; 17,800 mi) at 10 knots (19 km/h; 12 mph) surfaced; 340 nmi (630 km; 390 mi) at 5 knots (9.3 km/h; 5.8 mph) submerged
- Test depth: 280 m (920 ft)
- Complement: 57–60 crewmen
- Sensors & processing systems: Type F432 D2 Radar Transmitter; FuMB Ant 3 Bali Radar Detector
- Armament: 6 × bow torpedo tubes; 23 × 53.3 cm (21 in) torpedoes or 17 × torpedoes and 12 × TMC mines; 4 × 2 cm (0.8 in) AA guns or; 4 × 3.7 cm (1.5 in) AA guns

Service record
- Part of: 4th U-boat Flotilla; 12 January – 2 May 1945
- Identification codes: M 49 972
- Commanders: Oblt.z.S. Kurt van Meeteren; 12 January – 2 May 1945
- Operations: None
- Victories: None

German submarine U-3021 was a Type XXI U-boat (one of the "Elektroboote") of Nazi Germany's Kriegsmarine, built for service in World War II. She was ordered on 6 November 1943, and was laid down on 26 September 1944 at AG Weser, Bremen as yard number 1180. She was launched on 27 November 1944, and commissioned under the command of Oberleutnant zur See Kurt van Meeteren on 12 January 1945.

== Design ==
Like all Type XXI U-boats, U-3021 had a displacement of 1,621 tonnes (1,595 long tons) when at the surface and 1,819 tonnes (1,790 long tons) while submerged. She had a total length of 76.70 m (251 ft 8 in) (o/a), a beam of 8 m (26 ft 3 in), and a draught of 6.32 m (20 ft 9 in). The submarine was powered by two MAN SE supercharged six-cylinder M6V40/46KBB diesel engines each providing 4,000 metric horsepower (2,900 kilowatts; 3,900 shaft horsepower), two Siemens-Schuckert GU365/30 double-acting electric motors each providing 5,000 PS (3,700 kW; 4,900 shp), and two Siemens-Schuckert silent running GV232/28 electric motors each providing 226 PS (166 kW; 223 shp).

The submarine had a maximum surface speed of 15.6 knots (28.9 km/h; 18.0 mph) and a submerged speed of 17.2 knots (31.9 km/h; 19.8 mph). When running on silent motors the boat could operate at a speed of 6.1 knots (11.3 km/h; 7.0 mph). When submerged, the boat could operate at 5 knots (9.3 km/h; 5.8 mph) for 340 nautical miles (630 km; 390 mi); when surfaced, she could travel 15,500 nautical miles (28,700 km; 17,800 mi) at 10 knots (19 km/h; 12 mph). U-3021 was fitted with six 53.3 cm (21.0 in) torpedo tubes in the bow and four 2 cm (0.79 in) C/30 anti-aircraft guns. She could carry twenty-three torpedoes or seventeen torpedoes and twelve mines. The complement was five officers and fifty-two men.

== Fate ==
U-3021 was scuttled on 2 May 1945, at Travemünde, as part of Operation Regenbogen. The wreck was later raised and broken up.

== Bibliography ==
- Busch, Rainer; Röll, Hans-Joachim (1999). German U-boat commanders of World War II : a biographical dictionary. Translated by Brooks, Geoffrey. London, Annapolis, Md: Greenhill Books, Naval Institute Press. ISBN 1-55750-186-6.
- Busch, Rainer; Röll, Hans-Joachim (1999). Der U-Boot-Krieg, 1939-1945: Deutsche U-Boot-Verluste von September 1939 bis Mai 1945 [German U-boat losses from September 1939 to May 1945] (in German). Vol. IV. Hamburg, Berlin, Bonn: Mittler. ISBN 3-8132-0514-2.
- Gröner, Erich; Jung, Dieter; Maass, Martin (1991). U-boats and Mine Warfare Vessels. German Warships 1815–1945. Vol. 2. Translated by Thomas, Keith; Magowan, Rachel. London: Conway Maritime Press. ISBN 0-85177-593-4.
