= German submarine U-3509 =

German World War II submarine

History

Nazi Germany
- Name: U-3509
- Ordered: 6 November 1943
- Builder: Schichau-Werke, Danzig
- Yard number: 1654
- Laid down: 29 July 1944
- Launched: 27 September 1944
- Commissioned: 29 January 1945
- Fate: Scuttled on 3 May 1945

General characteristics
- Class & type: Type XXI submarine
- Displacement: 1,621 t (1,595 long tons) surfaced; 2,100 t (2,067 long tons) submerged
- Length: 76.70 m (251 ft 8 in) (o/a)
- Beam: 8 m (26 ft 3 in)
- Draught: 6.32 m (20 ft 9 in)
- Propulsion: Diesel/Electric; 2 × MAN M6V40/46KBB supercharged 6-cylinder diesel engines, 4,000 PS (2,900 kW; 3,900 shp); 2 × SSW GU365/30 double-acting electric motors, 5,000 PS (3,700 kW; 4,900 shp); 2 × SSW GV232/28 silent running electric motors, 226 PS (166 kW; 223 shp)
- Speed: Surfaced: 15.6 knots (28.9 km/h; 18.0 mph) (diesel); 17.9 knots (33.2 km/h; 20.6 mph) (electric); Submerged: 17.2 knots (31.9 km/h; 19.8 mph) (electric); 6.1 knots (11.3 km/h; 7.0 mph) (silent running motors)
- Range: 15,500 nmi (28,700 km; 17,800 mi) at 10 knots (19 km/h; 12 mph) surfaced; 340 nmi (630 km; 390 mi) at 5 knots (9.3 km/h; 5.8 mph) submerged
- Complement: 5 officers, 52 enlisted
- Sensors & processing systems: Type F432 D2 Radar Transmitter; FuMB Ant 3 Bali Radar Detector
- Armament: 6 × bow torpedo tubes; 23 × 53.3 cm (21 in) torpedoes; or 17 × torpedoes and 12 × mines; 4 × 2 cm (0.79 in) C/30 AA guns

Service record
- Part of: 5th U-boat Flotilla; 29 January – 3 May 1945
- Identification codes: M 47 968
- Commanders: Kptlt. Hans Hornkohl; August – November 1944; Oblt.z.S. / Kptlt. Karl-Heinz Voswinkel; 29 January – 14 March 1945; Kptlt. Heinz Franke; 15 March – 9 April 1945; Oblt.z.S. Wilhelm Neitzsch; 15 April – 3 May 1945
- Operations: None
- Victories: None

German submarine U-3509 was a Type XXI U-boat of Nazi Germany's Kriegsmarine during World War II. The Elektroboote submarine was laid down on 29 July 1944 at the Schichau-Werke yard at Danzig, launched on 27 September 1944, and commissioned on 29 January 1945 under the command of Oberleutnant zur See Karl-Heinz Voswinkel.

U-3509 was a brand new, high technology electric boat which could run constantly submerged rather than having to surface to recharge her batteries every day the way submarines until that point had had to do. However, these advanced vessels were introduced to the Kriegsmarine only late in 1944, much too late to influence the Battle of the Atlantic, and too late for many of them to serve in an offensive capacity at all.

With the end of the war near, training on U-boats had dropped to a minimum due to lack of fuel, falling morale and the effectiveness of allied attacks on U-boat construction and preparation. The exception to this were the new Type XXI boats, which continued to train in the Baltic Sea.

== Design ==
Like all Type XXI U-boats, U-3509 had a displacement of 1,621 tonnes (1,595 long tons) when at the surface and 1,819 tonnes (1,790 long tons) while submerged. She had a total length of 76.70 m (251 ft 8 in), a beam of 8 m (26 ft 3 in), and a draught of 6.32 m (20 ft 9 in). The submarine was powered by two MAN SE supercharged six-cylinder M6V40/46KBB diesel engines each providing 4,000 metric horsepower (2,900 kilowatts; 3,900 shaft horsepower), two Siemens-Schuckert GU365/30 double-acting electric motors each providing 5,000 PS (3,700 kW; 4,900 shp), and two Siemens-Schuckert silent running GV232/28 electric motors each providing 226 PS (166 kW; 223 shp).

The submarine had a maximum surface speed of 15.6 knots (28.9 km/h; 18.0 mph) and a submerged speed of 17.2 knots (31.9 km/h; 19.8 mph). When running on silent motors the boat could operate at a speed of 6.1 knots (11.3 km/h; 7.0 mph). When submerged, the boat could operate at 5 knots (9.3 km/h; 5.8 mph) for 340 nautical miles (630 km; 390 mi); when surfaced, she could travel 15,500 nautical miles (28,700 km; 17,800 mi) at 10 knots (19 km/h; 12 mph). U-3509 was fitted with six 53.3 cm (21.0 in) torpedo tubes in the bow and four 2 cm (0.79 in) C/30 anti-aircraft guns. She could carry twenty-three torpedoes or seventeen torpedoes and twelve mines. The complement was five officers and fifty-two men.

== Fate ==
U-3509 was damaged whilst under construction in September 1944 during an air raid, but she was eventually repaired and completed.

U-3509 was scuttled by her crew on 3 May 1945 in the River Weser estuary, Germany.

== Bibliography ==
- Busch, Rainer; Röll, Hans-Joachim (1999). German U-boat commanders of World War II : a biographical dictionary. Translated by Brooks, Geoffrey. London, Annapolis, Md: Greenhill Books, Naval Institute Press. ISBN 1-55750-186-6.
- Busch, Rainer; Röll, Hans-Joachim (1999). Der U-Boot-Krieg, 1939-1945: Deutsche U-Boot-Verluste von September 1939 bis Mai 1945 [German U-boat losses from September 1939 to May 1945] (in German). Vol. IV. Hamburg, Berlin, Bonn: Mittler. ISBN 3-8132-0514-2.
- Gröner, Erich; Jung, Dieter; Maass, Martin (1991). U-boats and Mine Warfare Vessels. German Warships 1815–1945. Vol. 2. Translated by Thomas, Keith; Magowan, Rachel. London: Conway Maritime Press. ISBN 0-85177-593-4.
- Sharpe, Peter (1998). U-Boat Fact File. Great Britain: Midland Publishing. ISBN 1-85780-072-9.
