= Silent running (submarine) =

Operating mode of submarines

Silent running is a stealth mode of operation for naval submarines. The aim is to evade discovery by passive sonar by eliminating superfluous noise: nonessential systems are shut down, the crew is urged to rest and refrain from making any unnecessary sound, and speed is greatly reduced to minimize propeller noise. The protocol has been in use since the latter part of World War I, when hydrophones were invented to detect U-boats.

The propellers have a characteristic RPM band in which no cavitation noise arises. Since this rotation speed is usually relatively low, the first electric submarines had special "silent running" engines designed for optimum performance at reduced speed. These required less active cooling (further reducing noise), and were generally equipped with plain bearings rather than ball bearings. These engines were also acoustically decoupled from the hull, as they employed belt transmission rather than direct coupling to the propeller shaft.

== See also ==
- Acoustic signature – Characteristic combination of sound emissons
- Acoustic quieting – Damping unwanted vibrations of machinery
- Anti-submarine warfare – Branch of naval warfare
- Countersurveillance – Measures undertaken to prevent surveillance
