= 31st U-boat Flotilla =

31. Unterseebootsflottille
- Active: September 1943–May 1945
- Country: Nazi Germany
- Branch: Kriegsmarine
- Type: U-boat flotilla
- Garrison/HQ: Hamburg; Wilhelmshaven; Wesermünde

Commanders
- Notable commanders: Korvkpt. Carl Emmermann

31st U-boat Flotilla ("31. Unterseebootsflottille") was a training flotilla ("Ausbildungsflottille") of Nazi Germany's Kriegsmarine during World War II.

The flotilla was formed in Hamburg in September 1943 under the command of Kapitän zur See Bruno Mahn. Later based at Wilhelmshaven, and then Wesermünde, it was commanded by Carl Emmermann for the final month of the war. It was disbanded in May 1945 when Germany surrendered.

== Flotilla commanders ==
- Kapitän zur See Bruno Mahn (September 1943–April 1945)
- Korvettenkapitän Carl Emmermann (April–May 1945)

== Assigned U-boats ==
156 U-boats were assigned to this flotilla during its service.

- U-120
- U-121
- U-140
- U-141
- U-148
- U-150
- U-151
- U-152
- U-235
- U-236
- U-237
- U-251
- U-276
- U-287
- U-291
- U-316
- U-349
- U-350
- U-367
- U-368
- U-369
- U-397
- U-428
- U-429
- U-430
- U-554
- U-560
- U-612
- U-677
- U-679
- U-680
- U-681
- U-682
- U-683
- U-708
- U-712
- U-720
- U-721
- U-722
- U-733
- U-746
- U-747
- U-748
- U-768
- U-771
- U-772
- U-773
- U-774
- U-775
- U-776
- U-777
- U-778
- U-779
- U-903
- U-905
- U-907
- U-922
- U-924
- U-975
- U-977
- U-982
- U-999
- U-1000
- U-1001
- U-1002
- U-1003
- U-1004
- U-1005
- U-1006
- U-1007
- U-1008
- U-1009
- U-1010
- U-1013
- U-1014
- U-1015
- U-1016
- U-1017
- U-1018
- U-1019
- U-1020
- U-1021
- U-1022
- U-1023
- U-1024
- U-1101
- U-1103
- U-1132
- U-1167
- U-1192
- U-1193
- U-1194
- U-1196
- U-1197
- U-1198
- U-1201
- U-1204
- U-1224
- U-1225
- U-1226
- U-1227
- U-1228
- U-1229
- U-1230
- U-1231
- U-1232
- U-1233
- U-1234
- U-1235
- U-2501
- U-2502
- U-2503
- U-2504
- U-2505
- U-2506
- U-2507
- U-2508
- U-2509
- U-2510
- U-2511
- U-2512
- U-2513
- U-2514
- U-2515
- U-2516
- U-2517
- U-2518
- U-2519
- U-2520
- U-2521
- U-2522
- U-2523
- U-2524
- U-2525
- U-2526
- U-2527
- U-2528
- U-2529
- U-2530
- U-2531
- U-2533
- U-2534
- U-2535
- U-2536
- U-2538
- U-2539
- U-2540
- U-2541
- U-2542
- U-2543
- U-2544
- U-2545
- U-2546
- U-2548
- U-2551
- U-2552
