= German submarine U-397 =

German World War II submarine

History

Nazi Germany
- Name: U-397
- Ordered: 20 January 1941
- Builder: Howaldtswerke, Kiel
- Yard number: 29
- Laid down: 29 August 1942
- Launched: 6 October 1943
- Commissioned: 20 November 1943
- Fate: Scuttled on 5 May 1945, in northern Germany

General characteristics
- Class & type: Type VIIC submarine
- Displacement: 769 tonnes (757 long tons) surfaced; 871 t (857 long tons) submerged
- Length: 67.23 m (220 ft 7 in) o/a; 50.50 m (165 ft 8 in) pressure hull
- Beam: 6.20 m (20 ft 4 in) o/a; 4.70 m (15 ft 5 in) pressure hull
- Height: 9.60 m (31 ft 6 in)
- Draught: 4.74 m (15 ft 7 in)
- Installed power: 2,800–3,200 PS (2,100–2,400 kW; 2,800–3,200 bhp) (diesels); 750 PS (550 kW; 740 shp) (electric)
- Propulsion: 2 shafts; 2 × diesel engines; 2 × electric motors
- Speed: 17.7 knots (32.8 km/h; 20.4 mph) surfaced; 7.6 knots (14.1 km/h; 8.7 mph) submerged
- Range: 8,500 nmi (15,700 km; 9,800 mi) at 10 knots (19 km/h; 12 mph) surfaced; 80 nmi (150 km; 92 mi) at 4 knots (7.4 km/h; 4.6 mph) submerged
- Test depth: 230 m (750 ft); Crush depth: 250–295 m (820–968 ft)
- Complement: 4 officers, 40–56 enlisted
- Armament: 5 × 53.3 cm (21 in) torpedo tubes (four bow, one stern); 14 × torpedoes; 1 × 3.7 cm (1.5 in) Flak M42 AA gun; 2 × twin 2 cm (0.79 in) C/30 anti-aircraft guns

Service record
- Part of: 5th U-boat Flotilla; 20 November 1943 – 31 May 1944; 7th U-boat Flotilla; 1 – 30 June 1944; 23rd U-boat Flotilla; 1 July 1944 – 19 February 1945; 31st U-boat Flotilla; 20 February – 5 May 1945
- Identification codes: M 53 543
- Commanders: Oblt.z.S. Fritz Kallipke; 20 November 1943 – 16 July 1944; Oblt.z.S. Friedrich Stege; 17 July 1944 – 25 April 1945; Kptlt. Gerhard Groth; 26 April – 5 May 1945
- Operations: 1 patrol: a. 8 – 24 June 1944; b. 28 June – 4 July 1944
- Victories: None

German submarine U-397 was a Type VIIC U-boat of Nazi Germany's Kriegsmarine during World War II.

She carried out one patrol. She did not sink or damage any ships.

She was scuttled in northern Germany on 5 May 1945.

== Design ==
German Type VIIC submarines were preceded by the shorter Type VIIB submarines. U-397 had a displacement of 769 tonnes (757 long tons) when at the surface and 871 tonnes (857 long tons) while submerged. She had a total length of 67.10 m (220 ft 2 in), a pressure hull length of 50.50 m (165 ft 8 in), a beam of 6.20 m (20 ft 4 in), a height of 9.60 m (31 ft 6 in), and a draught of 4.74 m (15 ft 7 in). The submarine was powered by two Germaniawerft F46 four-stroke, six-cylinder supercharged diesel engines producing a total of 2,800 to 3,200 metric horsepower (2,060 to 2,350 kW; 2,760 to 3,160 shp) for use while surfaced, two Garbe, Lahmeyer & Co. RP 137/c double-acting electric motors producing a total of 750 metric horsepower (550 kW; 740 shp) for use while submerged. She had two shafts and two 1.23 m (4 ft) propellers. The boat was capable of operating at depths of up to 230 metres (750 ft).

The submarine had a maximum surface speed of 17.7 knots (32.8 km/h; 20.4 mph) and a maximum submerged speed of 7.6 knots (14.1 km/h; 8.7 mph). When submerged, the boat could operate for 80 nautical miles (150 km; 92 mi) at 4 knots (7.4 km/h; 4.6 mph); when surfaced, she could travel 8,500 nautical miles (15,700 km; 9,800 mi) at 10 knots (19 km/h; 12 mph). U-397 was fitted with five 53.3 cm (21 in) torpedo tubes (four fitted at the bow and one at the stern), fourteen torpedoes, one 3.7 cm (1.5 in) Flak M42 and two twin 2 cm (0.79 in) C/30 anti-aircraft guns. The boat had a complement of between forty-four and sixty.

== Service history ==
The submarine was laid down on 29 August 1942 at the Howaldtswerke (yard) at Kiel as yard number 29, launched on 6 October 1943 and commissioned on 20 November under the command of Oberleutnant zur See Fritz Kallipke.

She served with the 5th U-boat Flotilla from 20 November 1943 and the 7th flotilla from 1 June of the same year. She was reassigned to the 23rd flotilla on 1 July 1944, then the 31st flotilla on 20 February 1945.

The boat's first patrol was preceded by the short journey from Kiel in Germany to Stavanger, arriving at the Norwegian port on 2 June 1944.

=== Patrol ===
U-397 departed Stavanger on 8 June 1944 and arrived back there on the 24th.

The boat moved back to Kiel on 4 July 1944.

=== Fate ===
The submarine was scuttled on 5 May 1945 in Geltinger Bucht (east of Flensburg).

== Bibliography ==
- Busch, Rainer; Röll, Hans-Joachim (1999). German U-boat commanders of World War II : a biographical dictionary. Translated by Brooks, Geoffrey. London, Annapolis, Md: Greenhill Books, Naval Institute Press. ISBN 1-55750-186-6.
- Busch, Rainer; Röll, Hans-Joachim (1999). Deutsche U-Boot-Verluste von September 1939 bis Mai 1945 [German U-boat losses from September 1939 to May 1945]. Der U-Boot-Krieg (in German). Vol. IV. Hamburg, Berlin, Bonn: Mittler. ISBN 3-8132-0514-2.
- Gröner, Erich; Jung, Dieter; Maass, Martin (1991). U-boats and Mine Warfare Vessels. German Warships 1815–1945. Vol. 2. Translated by Thomas, Keith; Magowan, Rachel. London: Conway Maritime Press. ISBN 0-85177-593-4.
