= German submarine U-276 =

German World War II submarine

History

Nazi Germany
- Name: U-276
- Ordered: 10 April 1941
- Builder: Bremer Vulkan, Bremen-Vegesack
- Yard number: 41
- Laid down: 24 February 1942
- Launched: 24 October 1942
- Commissioned: 9 December 1942
- Fate: De-commissioned on 29 September 1944. Employed as a floating electrical generator. Sunk on 3 May 1945

General characteristics
- Class & type: Type VIIC submarine
- Displacement: 769 tonnes (757 long tons) surfaced; 871 t (857 long tons) submerged
- Length: 67.10 m (220 ft 2 in) o/a; 50.50 m (165 ft 8 in) pressure hull
- Beam: 6.20 m (20 ft 4 in) o/a; 4.70 m (15 ft 5 in) pressure hull
- Height: 9.60 m (31 ft 6 in)
- Draught: 4.74 m (15 ft 7 in)
- Installed power: 2,800–3,200 PS (2,100–2,400 kW; 2,800–3,200 bhp) (diesels); 750 PS (550 kW; 740 shp) (electric)
- Propulsion: 2 shafts; 2 × diesel engines; 2 × electric motors
- Speed: 17.7 knots (32.8 km/h; 20.4 mph) surfaced; 7.6 knots (14.1 km/h; 8.7 mph) submerged
- Range: 8,500 nmi (15,700 km; 9,800 mi) at 10 knots (19 km/h; 12 mph) surfaced; 80 nmi (150 km; 92 mi) at 4 knots (7.4 km/h; 4.6 mph) submerged
- Test depth: 230 m (750 ft); Crush depth: 250–295 m (820–968 ft)
- Complement: 4 officers, 40–56 enlisted
- Armament: 5 × 53.3 cm (21 in) torpedo tubes (four bow, one stern); 14 × torpedoes or 26 TMA mines; 1 × 8.8 cm (3.46 in) deck gun (220 rounds); 2 × twin 2 cm (0.79 in) C/30 anti-aircraft guns

Service record
- Part of: 8th U-boat Flotilla; 9 December 1942 – 29 February 1944; 1st U-boat Flotilla; 1 March – 1 July 1944; 31st U-boat Flotilla; 1 July – 29 September 1944
- Identification codes: M 49 169
- Commanders: Oblt.z.S. Jürgen Thimme; 9 December 1942 – 19 October 1943; Kptlt. Rolf Borchers; 20 October 1943 – 18 July 1944; Kptlt. Heinz Zwang; 19 July – 29 September 1944
- Operations: 3 patrols: 1st patrol: 22 March – 6 April 1944; 2nd patrol: a. 18 April – 2 May 1944; b. 24 – 25 May 1944; c. 28 – 31 May 1944; 3rd patrol: a. 8 – 25 June 1944; b. 28 June 1944; c. 1 – 6 July 1944
- Victories: None

German submarine U-276 was a Type VIIC U-boat of Nazi Germany's Kriegsmarine during World War II.

The submarine was laid down on 24 February 1942 at the Bremer Vulkan yard at Bremen-Vegesack as yard number 41. She was launched on 24 October and commissioned on 9 December under the command of Oberleutnant zur See Jürgen Thimme.

== Design ==
German Type VIIC submarines were preceded by the shorter Type VIIB submarines. U-276 had a displacement of 769 tonnes (757 long tons) when at the surface and 871 tonnes (857 long tons) while submerged. She had a total length of 67.10 m (220 ft 2 in), a pressure hull length of 50.50 m (165 ft 8 in), a beam of 6.20 m (20 ft 4 in), a height of 9.60 m (31 ft 6 in), and a draught of 4.74 m (15 ft 7 in). The submarine was powered by two Germaniawerft F46 four-stroke, six-cylinder supercharged diesel engines producing a total of 2,800 to 3,200 metric horsepower (2,060 to 2,350 kW; 2,760 to 3,160 shp) for use while surfaced, two AEG GU 460/8–27 double-acting electric motors producing a total of 750 metric horsepower (550 kW; 740 shp) for use while submerged. She had two shafts and two 1.23 m (4 ft) propellers. The boat was capable of operating at depths of up to 230 metres (750 ft).

The submarine had a maximum surface speed of 17.7 knots (32.8 km/h; 20.4 mph) and a maximum submerged speed of 7.6 knots (14.1 km/h; 8.7 mph). When submerged, the boat could operate for 80 nautical miles (150 km; 92 mi) at 4 knots (7.4 km/h; 4.6 mph); when surfaced, she could travel 8,500 nautical miles (15,700 km; 9,800 mi) at 10 knots (19 km/h; 12 mph). U-276 was fitted with five 53.3 cm (21 in) torpedo tubes (four fitted at the bow and one at the stern), fourteen torpedoes, one 8.8 cm (3.46 in) SK C/35 naval gun, 220 rounds, and two twin 2 cm (0.79 in) C/30 anti-aircraft guns. The boat had a complement of between forty-four and sixty.

== Service history ==
U-276 served with the 8th U-boat Flotilla for training from December 1942 to February 1944 and operationally with the 1st U-boat Flotilla from 1 March 1944. She was then reassigned to the 31st U-boat Flotilla on 1 July. She carried out three patrols, but sank no ships.

She was 'stricken' in September 1944 at Neustadt and used as a floating electrical generating plant. She was scuttled in May 1945.

She carried out short voyages between Kiel in Germany and Bergen and Trondheim in Norway over February and March 1944.

=== First patrol ===
The boat departed Trondheim on 22 March 1944 and returned to the Norwegian port fifteen days later on 6 April.

=== Second patrol ===
Her second sortie was relatively uneventful, apart from two crew members being wounded in an accident with the anti-aircraft gun.

=== Third patrol ===
By now the boat was based at Stavanger, from where she departed on 8 June 1944. She returned there on the 25th.

The submarine sailed back to Kiel in July 1944.

=== Fate ===
The boat was 'stricken' at Neustadt on 29 September 1944 and re-employed as a floating electrical generator. On 3 May 1945, the U-boat was damaged in a rocket attack by four Hawker Typhoons of No. 175 Squadron RAF. As a result of the damage, she was scuttled later that same day.

== Bibliography ==
- Busch, Rainer; Röll, Hans-Joachim (1999). German U-boat commanders of World War II : a biographical dictionary. Translated by Brooks, Geoffrey. London, Annapolis, Md: Greenhill Books, Naval Institute Press. ISBN 1-55750-186-6.
- Busch, Rainer; Röll, Hans-Joachim (1999). Der U-Boot-Krieg, 1939-1945: Deutsche U-Boot-Verluste von September 1939 bis Mai 1945 [German U-boat losses from September 1939 to May 1945] (in German). Vol. IV. Hamburg, Berlin, Bonn: Mittler. ISBN 3-8132-0514-2.
- Gröner, Erich; Jung, Dieter; Maass, Martin (1991). U-boats and Mine Warfare Vessels. German Warships 1815–1945. Vol. 2. Translated by Thomas, Keith; Magowan, Rachel. London: Conway Maritime Press. ISBN 0-85177-593-4.
