= German submarine U-1234 =

German World War II submarine

Coordinates: 54°50′N 9°29′E

History

Nazi Germany
- Name: U-1234
- Ordered: 14 October 1941
- Builder: Deutsche Werft, Hamburg
- Yard number: 397
- Laid down: 11 May 1943
- Launched: 7 January 1944
- Commissioned: 19 April 1944
- Decommissioned: 15 May 1944
- Recommissioned: 17 October 1944
- Fate: Sunk on 14 May 1944 after colliding the steam tug Anton; Scuttled on 5 May 1945 during Operation Regenbogen

General characteristics
- Class & type: Type IXC/40 submarine
- Displacement: 1,144 t (1,126 long tons) surfaced; 1,257 t (1,237 long tons) submerged
- Length: 76.76 m (251 ft 10 in) o/a; 58.75 m (192 ft 9 in) pressure hull
- Beam: 6.86 m (22 ft 6 in) o/a; 4.44 m (14 ft 7 in) pressure hull
- Height: 9.60 m (31 ft 6 in)
- Draught: 4.67 m (15 ft 4 in)
- Installed power: 4,400 PS (3,200 kW; 4,300 bhp) (diesels); 1,000 PS (740 kW; 990 shp) (electric)
- Propulsion: 2 shafts; 2 × diesel engines; 2 × electric motors
- Speed: 18.3 knots (33.9 km/h; 21.1 mph) surfaced; 7.3 knots (13.5 km/h; 8.4 mph) submerged
- Range: 13,850 nmi (25,650 km; 15,940 mi) at 10 knots (19 km/h; 12 mph) surfaced; 63 nmi (117 km; 72 mi) at 4 knots (7.4 km/h; 4.6 mph) submerged
- Test depth: 230 m (750 ft)
- Complement: 4 officers, 44 enlisted
- Armament: 6 × torpedo tubes (4 bow, 2 stern); 22 × 53.3 cm (21 in) torpedoes; 1 × 3.7 cm (1.5 in) Flak M42 AA gun; 2 x twin 2 cm (0.79 in) C/30 AA guns

Service record
- Part of: 31st U-boat Flotilla; 19 April – 15 May 1944; 17 October 1944 – 31 January 1945; 4th U-boat Flotilla; 1 February – 5 May 1945
- Identification codes: M 50 706
- Commanders: Kptlt. Helmut Thurmann; 19 April – 14 May 1944; Oblt.z.S. Hans-Christian Wrede; 17 October 1944 – 5 May 1945
- Operations: None
- Victories: None

German submarine U-1234 was a Type IXC/40 U-boat of Nazi Germany's Kriegsmarine built during World War II for service in the Battle of the Atlantic. U-1234 was unusual for having sunk twice, once by accident and once as part of the great destruction of the remaining Kriegsmarine in the days before the surrender.

== Design ==
German Type IXC/40 submarines were slightly larger than the original Type IXCs. U-1234 had a displacement of 1,144 tonnes (1,126 long tons) when at the surface and 1,257 tonnes (1,237 long tons) while submerged. The U-boat had a total length of 76.76 m (251 ft 10 in), a pressure hull length of 58.75 m (192 ft 9 in), a beam of 6.86 m (22 ft 6 in), a height of 9.60 m (31 ft 6 in), and a draught of 4.67 m (15 ft 4 in). The submarine was powered by two MAN M 9 V 40/46 supercharged four-stroke, nine-cylinder diesel engines producing a total of 4,400 metric horsepower (3,240 kW; 4,340 shp) for use while surfaced, two Siemens-Schuckert 2 GU 345/34 double-acting electric motors producing a total of 1,000 shaft horsepower (1,010 PS; 750 kW) for use while submerged. She had two shafts and two 1.92 m (6 ft) propellers. The boat was capable of operating at depths of up to 230 metres (750 ft).

The submarine had a maximum surface speed of 18.3 knots (33.9 km/h; 21.1 mph) and a maximum submerged speed of 7.3 knots (13.5 km/h; 8.4 mph). When submerged, the boat could operate for 63 nautical miles (117 km; 72 mi) at 4 knots (7.4 km/h; 4.6 mph); when surfaced, she could travel 13,850 nautical miles (25,650 km; 15,940 mi) at 10 knots (19 km/h; 12 mph). U-1234 was fitted with six 53.3 cm (21 in) torpedo tubes (four fitted at the bow and two at the stern), 22 torpedoes, and a 3.7 cm (1.5 in) Flak M42 as well as two twin 2 cm (0.79 in) C/30 anti-aircraft guns. The boat had a complement of forty-eight.

== Service history ==
U-1234 was delayed in her construction and did not reach full service status until almost a year after her construction began, a very long time for a U-boat. She was given to Kapitänleutnant Helmut Thurmann to command, and he began her process of mechanical testing and operational training in the Baltic Sea. Just under a month after her commissioning, whilst cruising off Gdynia on the night of 14/15 May, she was struck on the broadside by the steam tug Anton. The boat was holed and rapidly began to sink, slipping below the waves leaving her commander and most of her crew bobbing in the sea. Thirteen crew never reached the shore or the rescue boats and went down with their ship.

On 17 October 1944, the boat was raised by divers and lifting equipment from the sea bed, and repaired and recommissioned into the Kriegsmarine. Such severe damage had been done to her vital systems however that she was no longer suitable for full combat duty, and was seconded to a training flotilla, where she remained to the end of the war. On 5 May 1945 her crew took her into the Hörup Haff off Flensburg and scuttled her to keep her from falling into Allied hands as their ground forces approached the port.

== Bibliography ==
- Busch, Rainer; Röll, Hans-Joachim (1999). German U-boat commanders of World War II : a biographical dictionary. Translated by Brooks, Geoffrey. London, Annapolis, Md: Greenhill Books, Naval Institute Press. ISBN 1-55750-186-6.
- Busch, Rainer; Röll, Hans-Joachim (1999). Deutsche U-Boot-Verluste von September 1939 bis Mai 1945 [German U-boat losses from September 1939 to May 1945]. Der U-Boot-Krieg (in German). Vol. IV. Hamburg, Berlin, Bonn: Mittler. ISBN 3-8132-0514-2.
- Gröner, Erich; Jung, Dieter; Maass, Martin (1991). German Warships 1815–1945, U-boats and Mine Warfare Vessels. Vol. 2. Translated by Thomas, Keith; Magowan, Rachel. London: Conway Maritime Press. ISBN 0-85177-593-4.
- Sharpe, Peter (1998). U-Boat Fact File. Great Britain: Midland Publishing. ISBN 1-85780-072-9.
