= German submarine U-369 =

German World War II submarine

Coordinates: 55°31′N 7°27′W

History

Nazi Germany
- Name: U-369
- Ordered: 25 August 1941
- Builder: Flensburger Schiffbau-Gesellschaft, Flensburg
- Yard number: 492
- Laid down: 6 October 1942
- Launched: 17 August 1943
- Commissioned: 15 October 1943
- Fate: Surrendered at Kristainsund-Sud on 9 May 1945, sunk as part of Operation Deadlight on 30 November 1945

General characteristics
- Class & type: Type VIIC submarine
- Displacement: 769 tonnes (757 long tons) surfaced; 871 t (857 long tons) submerged
- Length: 67.23 m (220 ft 7 in) o/a; 50.50 m (165 ft 8 in) pressure hull
- Beam: 6.20 m (20 ft 4 in) o/a; 4.70 m (15 ft 5 in) pressure hull
- Height: 9.60 m (31 ft 6 in)
- Draught: 4.74 m (15 ft 7 in)
- Installed power: 2,800–3,200 PS (2,100–2,400 kW; 2,800–3,200 bhp) (diesels); 750 PS (550 kW; 740 shp) (electric)
- Propulsion: 2 shafts; 2 × diesel engines; 2 × electric motors
- Speed: 17.7 knots (32.8 km/h; 20.4 mph) surfaced; 7.6 knots (14.1 km/h; 8.7 mph) submerged
- Range: 8,500 nmi (15,700 km; 9,800 mi) at 10 knots (19 km/h; 12 mph) surfaced; 80 nmi (150 km; 92 mi) at 4 knots (7.4 km/h; 4.6 mph) submerged
- Test depth: 230 m (750 ft); Crush depth: 250–295 m (820–968 ft)
- Complement: 4 officers, 40–56 enlisted
- Armament: 5 × 53.3 cm (21 in) torpedo tubes (four bow, one stern); 14 × torpedoes; 1 × 8.8 cm (3.46 in) deck gun (220 rounds); 2 × twin 2 cm (0.79 in) C/30 anti-aircraft guns

Service record
- Part of: 22nd U-boat Flotilla; 15 October 1943 – 28 February 1945; 11th U-boat Flotilla; 1 March – 8 May 1945
- Identification codes: M 53 519
- Commanders: Kptlt. Ludwig Schaafhausen; 15 October 1943 – 15 April 1945; Oblt.z.S. Hans-Norbert Schunck; 16 April – 9 May 1945
- Operations: None
- Victories: None

German submarine U-369 was a Type VIIC U-boat of Nazi Germany's Kriegsmarine during World War II.

She carried out no patrols. She did not sink or damage any ships.

She was sunk after Germany's surrender as part of Operation Deadlight on 30 November 1945.

== Design ==
German Type VIIC submarines were preceded by the shorter Type VIIB submarines. U-369 had a displacement of 769 tonnes (757 long tons) when at the surface and 871 tonnes (857 long tons) while submerged. She had a total length of 67.10 m (220 ft 2 in), a pressure hull length of 50.50 m (165 ft 8 in), a beam of 6.20 m (20 ft 4 in), a height of 9.60 m (31 ft 6 in), and a draught of 4.74 m (15 ft 7 in). The submarine was powered by two Germaniawerft F46 four-stroke, six-cylinder supercharged diesel engines producing a total of 2,800 to 3,200 metric horsepower (2,060 to 2,350 kW; 2,760 to 3,160 shp) for use while surfaced, two AEG GU 460/8-276 double-acting electric motors producing a total of 750 metric horsepower (550 kW; 740 shp) for use while submerged. She had two shafts and two 1.23 m (4 ft) propellers. The boat was capable of operating at depths of up to 230 metres (750 ft).

The submarine had a maximum surface speed of 17.7 knots (32.8 km/h; 20.4 mph) and a maximum submerged speed of 7.6 knots (14.1 km/h; 8.7 mph). When submerged, the boat could operate for 80 nautical miles (150 km; 92 mi) at 4 knots (7.4 km/h; 4.6 mph); when surfaced, she could travel 8,500 nautical miles (15,700 km; 9,800 mi) at 10 knots (19 km/h; 12 mph). U-369 was fitted with five 53.3 cm (21 in) torpedo tubes (four fitted at the bow and one at the stern), fourteen torpedoes, one 8.8 cm (3.46 in) SK C/35 naval gun, 220 rounds, and two twin 2 cm (0.79 in) C/30 anti-aircraft guns. The boat had a complement of between forty-four and sixty.

== Service history ==
The submarine was laid down on 6 October 1942 at the Flensburger Schiffbau-Gesellschaft yard at Flensburg as yard number 492, launched on 17 August 1943 and commissioned on 15 October under the command of Kapitänleutnant Ludwig Schaafhausen. She served with the 22nd U-boat Flotilla from 15 October 1943 and the 11th flotilla from 1 March 1945.

=== Fate ===
U-369 surrendered at Kristiansand-Sud in Norway on 5 May 1945. She was transferred to Scapa Flow in Scotland for Operation Deadlight on 29 May. She was sunk on 30 November.

== Bibliography ==
- Busch, Rainer; Röll, Hans-Joachim (1999). German U-boat commanders of World War II: a biographical dictionary. Translated by Brooks, Geoffrey. London, Annapolis, Md: Greenhill Books, Naval Institute Press. ISBN 1-55750-186-6.
- Busch, Rainer; Röll, Hans-Joachim (1999). Deutsche U-Boot-Verluste von September 1939 bis Mai 1945 [German U-boat losses from September 1939 to May 1945]. Der U-Boot-Krieg (in German). Vol. IV. Hamburg, Berlin, Bonn: Mittler. ISBN 3-8132-0514-2.
- Gröner, Erich; Jung, Dieter; Maass, Martin (1991). U-boats and Mine Warfare Vessels. German Warships 1815–1945. Vol. 2. Translated by Thomas, Keith; Magowan, Rachel. London: Conway Maritime Press. ISBN 0-85177-593-4.
