= 23rd U-boat Flotilla =

23. Unterseebootsflottille
- Active: September 1941–May 1942; September 1943–March 1945
- Country: Nazi Germany
- Branch: Kriegsmarine
- Type: U-boat flotilla

Commanders
- Notable commanders: Kptlt. Fritz Frauenheim; Korvkpt. Otto von Bülow

23rd U-boat Flotilla ("23. Unterseebootsflottille") was a unit of Nazi Germany's Kriegsmarine during World War II.

The flotilla was first formed in Salamis, Greece, on 11 September 1941 under the command of Kapitänleutnant Fritz Frauenheim. It operated in the eastern Mediterranean and sank 12 ships for a total of 50,820 gross register tons (GRT). In May 1942 the flotilla was merged into 29th U-boat Flotilla, based at La Spezia, Italy.

The flotilla was re-founded in September 1943 as a Training Flotilla under the command of Korvettenkapitän Otto von Bülow, based at Danzig. It trained new U-boat commanders in attack techniques (Kommandantenschiesslehrgang, "Commanders shooting training course"). The flotilla was disbanded in March 1945.

== Assigned U-boats ==
Nine U-boats were assigned to this flotilla during its combat service in 1941–1942.

- U-75
- U-77
- U-79
- U-83
- U-97
- U-133
- U-331
- U-371
- U-559
