= HMS Tremadoc Bay =

1945 Bay-class anti-aircraft frigate of the Royal Navy

History

United Kingdom
- Name: HMS Tremadoc Bay
- Namesake: Tremadoc Bay, Gwynedd
- Builder: Harland & Wolff
- Yard number: 1253
- Laid down: 31 August 1944
- Launched: 29 March 1945
- Completed: 11 October 1945
- Commissioned: 11 October 1945
- Decommissioned: April 1951
- Identification: Pennant number K605
- Fate: Sold for scrapping, 1959
- Badge: On a Field Blue barry wavy of 4 in base Blue and white, three escallops conjoined in fess, Gold.

General characteristics
- Class & type: Bay-class anti-aircraft frigate
- Displacement: 1,600 long tons standard, 2,530 tons full
- Length: 286 ft (87 m) p/p, 307 ft 3 in (93.65 m) o/a
- Beam: 38 ft 6 in (11.73 m)
- Draught: 12 ft 9 in (3.89 m)
- Propulsion: 2 Admiralty 3-drum boilers, 2 shafts, 4-cylinder vertical triple expansion reciprocating engines, 5,500 ihp (4,100 kW)
- Range: 724 tons oil fuel, 9,500 nmi (17,600 km) at 12 knots (22 km/h)
- Complement: 157
- Armament: 4 × QF 4-inch (100 mm) Mark XVI on 2 twin mounting HA/LA Mk.XIX; 4 × 40 mm Bofors A/A on 2 twin mounts Mk.V; 4 × 20 mm Oerlikon A/A on 2 twin mounts Mk.V; 1 × Hedgehog 24 barrel A/S projector; 2 rails and 4 throwers for 50 depth charges

HMS Tremadoc Bay was a Bay-class anti-aircraft frigate of the British Royal Navy, named for Tremadoc Bay in north Wales.

The ship was ordered from Harland and Wolff at Belfast on 2 May 1943 as a Loch-class frigate to be named Loch Arnish. The contract was changed in 1944, and the Bay-class ship was laid down on 31 August 1944, launched on 29 March 1945, and completed on 11 October 1945 after the end of hostilities.

== Service history ==
After sea trials and weapons testing, Tremadoc Bay sailed on her first mission; towing a German Type XXI submarine to the Baltic Sea to be handed over to the Soviet Navy. The Tripartite Naval Agreement had agreed that all German U-boats would be sunk, apart from 30 that would be preserved and divided equally between the USSR, United Kingdom and United States for experimental and technical purposes. On 24 November, as part of "Operation Cabal", Tremadoc Bay left Lisahally, Northern Ireland, with U-3035 in tow, in company with the frigate Narborough towing U-3041. Unfortunately bad weather in the North Sea, and problems with the towing gear forced them to divert to Rosyth. She eventually sailed again on 7 December, arriving at Libau, Latvia, on the 14th, before sailing to Plymouth.

In February 1946 she towed the Type XXIII submarine U-2326, in company with the tug Bustler towing the Type XXI submarine U-2518, from Lisahally to Cherbourg for hand-over to the French Navy in "Operation Thankful". Once again towing problems in heavy weather forced her to take shelter, this time in Dublin Bay.

In March Tremadoc Bay was deployed for training and emergency duties with Plymouth Local Flotilla. In September 1947 she was deployed with sister ship Burghead Bay to the Mediterranean to escort the ships SS Ocean Vigour, SS Empire Rival and SS Runnymede Park from Port-de-Bouc near Marseille to Gibraltar. These ships were transporting Jewish illegal immigrants, detained from SS Exodus while attempting to enter Palestine, back to Europe.

Tremadoc Bay then resumed Local Flotilla duties at Plymouth, remaining there until April 1951, when she was decommissioned and put into Reserve at Devonport. She remained at Devonport until 1953 when she was refitted at Falmouth, then towed to Gibraltar still in Reserve. In 1958 she was placed on the Disposal List, in 1959, prior to being sold to an Italian shipbreaker, Tremadoc Bay made an appearance in the Film Silent Enemy, the film of Lt. Lionel Buster Crabb RNVR about the work defusing mines in Gibraltar during WW2, some time after this, she was taken under tow, and arrived at Genoa on 18 September for scrapping.

== Publications ==
- Colledge, J. J.; Warlow, Ben (2006) [1969]. Ships of the Royal Navy: The Complete Record of All Fighting Ships of the Royal Navy from the 15th Century to the Present (3rd Rev ed.). London: Chatham Publishing. ISBN 978-1-86176-281-8. OCLC 67375475.
- Lenton, H.T., British and Empire Warships of the Second World War, Greenhill Books, ISBN 1-85367-277-7
- Marriott, Leo, Royal Navy Frigates 1945–1983, Ian Allan, 1983, ISBN 0-7110-1322-5
