= German submarine U-3515 =

German World War II submarine

History

Nazi Germany
- Name: U-3515
- Ordered: 6 November 1943
- Builder: F Schichau GmbH, Danzig
- Yard number: 1660
- Laid down: 27 August 1944
- Launched: 4 November 1944
- Commissioned: 14 December 1944
- Fate: Surrendered on 9 May 1945

Soviet Union
- Name: B-30
- Commissioned: 13 February 1946
- Stricken: 25 September 1959
- Fate: Broken up for scrap on either 30 November 1959 or 5 February 1973

General characteristics
- Class & type: Type XXI submarine
- Displacement: 1,621 t (1,595 long tons) surfaced; 1,819 t (1,790 long tons) submerged
- Length: 76.70 m (251 ft 8 in) (o/a); 60.50 m (198 ft 6 in) (p/h)
- Beam: 8 m (26 ft 3 in) (o/a); 5.3 m (17 ft 5 in) (p/h)
- Height: 11.30 m (37 ft 1 in)
- Draught: 6.32 m (20 ft 9 in)
- Installed power: 4,000 PS (2,900 kW; 3,900 shp) (diesel drive); 5,000 PS (3,700 kW; 4,900 shp) (standard electric drive); 226 PS (166 kW; 223 shp) (silent electric drive)
- Propulsion: Diesel/Electric; 2 × MAN M6V40/46KBB supercharged 6-cylinder diesel engines; 2 × SSW GU365/30 double-acting electric motors; 2 × SSW GV232/28 silent running electric motors
- Speed: Surfaced: 15.6 knots (28.9 km/h; 18.0 mph) (diesel); 17.9 knots (33.2 km/h; 20.6 mph) (electric); Submerged: 17.2 knots (31.9 km/h; 19.8 mph) (electric); 6.1 knots (11.3 km/h; 7.0 mph) (silent running motors)
- Range: 15,500 nmi (28,700 km; 17,800 mi) at 10 knots (19 km/h; 12 mph) surfaced; 340 nmi (630 km; 390 mi) at 5 knots (9.3 km/h; 5.8 mph) submerged
- Test depth: 280 m (920 ft)
- Complement: 57–60 crewmen
- Sensors & processing systems: Type F432 D2 Radar Transmitter; FuMB Ant 3 Bali Radar Detector
- Armament: 6 × bow torpedo tubes; 23 × 53.3 cm (21 in) torpedoes or 17 × torpedoes and 12 × TMC mines; 4 × 2 cm (0.8 in) AA guns or; 4 × 3.7 cm (1.5 in) AA guns

Service record (Kriegsmarine)
- Part of: 8th U-boat Flotilla; 14 December 1944 – 15 February 1945; 5th U-boat Flotilla; 16 February – 8 May 1945
- Identification codes: M 49 612
- Commanders: Oblt.z.S. Fedor Kuscher; 14 December 1944 – 9 May 1945
- Operations: None
- Victories: None

German submarine U-3515 was a Type XXI U-boat (one of the "Elektroboote") of Nazi Germany's Kriegsmarine, built for service in World War II. She was ordered on 6 November 1943, and was laid down on 27 August 1944 at F Schichau GmbH, Danzig, as yard number 1660. She was launched on 4 November 1944, and commissioned under the command of Oberleutnant zur See Fedor Kuscher on 14 December 1944.

== Design ==
Like all Type XXI U-boats, U-3515 had a displacement of 1,621 tonnes (1,595 long tons) when at the surface and 1,819 tonnes (1,790 long tons) while submerged. She had a total length of 76.70 m (251 ft 8 in) (o/a), a beam of 8 m (26 ft 3 in), and a draught of 6.32 m (20 ft 9 in). The submarine was powered by two MAN SE supercharged six-cylinder M6V40/46KBB diesel engines each providing 4,000 metric horsepower (2,900 kilowatts; 3,900 shaft horsepower), two Siemens-Schuckert GU365/30 double-acting electric motors each providing 5,000 PS (3,700 kW; 4,900 shp), and two Siemens-Schuckert silent running GV232/28 electric motors each providing 226 PS (166 kW; 223 shp).

The submarine had a maximum surface speed of 15.6 knots (28.9 km/h; 18.0 mph) and a submerged speed of 17.2 knots (31.9 km/h; 19.8 mph). When running on silent motors the boat could operate at a speed of 6.1 knots (11.3 km/h; 7.0 mph). When submerged, the boat could operate at 5 knots (9.3 km/h; 5.8 mph) for 340 nautical miles (630 km; 390 mi); when surfaced, she could travel 15,500 nautical miles (28,700 km; 17,800 mi) at 10 knots (19 km/h; 12 mph). U-3515 was fitted with six 53.3 cm (21.0 in) torpedo tubes in the bow and four 2 cm (0.79 in) C/30 anti-aircraft guns. She could carry twenty-three torpedoes or seventeen torpedoes and twelve mines. The complement was five officers and fifty-two men.

== Service history ==
On 9 May 1945, U-3515 surrendered at Horten, Norway. She was later transferred to Oslo on 18 May 1945, then to Scapa Flow, Scotland on 3 June, arriving on 6 June, and finally Lisahally, Northern Ireland on 8 June 1945, arriving on 9 June 1945.

== Post war service ==
The Tripartite Naval Commission allocated U-3515 to the Soviet Union in November 1945. On 2 February 1946, she arrived in Libau, Latvia, as British N-class N30, after having been kept in the United Kingdom. On 13 February 1946, the Soviet Navy renamed her N-27, and a Soviet crew was assigned to the submarine on 15 February 1946. Her commander from May 1946 to November 1947 was future Soviet admiral Vladimir Konovalov. She was allocated to the 1st Submarine Division of the 1st Submarine Brigade, Baltic Fleet, and was renamed B-30 (designated as a Б – (B) large type submarine) on 9 June 1949.

Sources give conflicting information for the rest of its career. According to one, it was sent to the reserve fleet on 29 December 1955. B-30 was redesignated on 18 January 1956, as a floating submarine battery recharging station PZS-35. Redesignated as test hulk B-100 on 2 July 1958, until finally being struck from the Soviet Navy on 25 September 1959, and broken up for scrap on 30 November 1959. Another source states that as of March 1951, she was reassigned to 27th Submarine Division, 158th Submarine Brigade, and turned into a test hulk on 10 June 1955 and renamed BSh-28, before being renamed on 9 January 1957 as UTS-3, reflecting its new status as stationary training submarine. UTS-3 was struck from the navy list on 1 September 1972, and sold for scrap on 5 February 1973. There is a photograph of the UTS-3 at a scrapyard that is dated to the early 1970s.

== Bibliography ==
- Busch, Rainer; Röll, Hans-Joachim (1999). German U-boat commanders of World War II : a biographical dictionary. Translated by Brooks, Geoffrey. London, Annapolis, Md: Greenhill Books, Naval Institute Press. ISBN 1-55750-186-6.
- Busch, Rainer; Röll, Hans-Joachim (1999). Der U-Boot-Krieg, 1939-1945: Deutsche U-Boot-Verluste von September 1939 bis Mai 1945 [German U-boat losses from September 1939 to May 1945] (in German). Vol. IV. Hamburg, Berlin, Bonn: Mittler. ISBN 3-8132-0514-2.
- Gröner, Erich; Jung, Dieter; Maass, Martin (1991). U-boats and Mine Warfare Vessels. German Warships 1815–1945. Vol. 2. Translated by Thomas, Keith; Magowan, Rachel. London: Conway Maritime Press. ISBN 0-85177-593-4.
