= Tripartite Naval Commission =

The Tripartite Naval Commission (TNC) was a naval commission founded by the United States, United Kingdom and the USSR in order to allocate seized German ships and submarines to the said nations. France was excluded due to Soviet intervention. It was a consequence of the Potsdam Heads of State Conference which took place in Berlin between 17 July and 2 August 1945. The record of the Conference – the so-called Potsdam Agreement – stated that:

"The Three Governments agree to constitute a Tripartite Naval Commission to submit agreed recommendations to the Three Governments for the allocation of specific German warships" and that "The Three Governments agreed that transfers shall be completed as soon as possible, but not later than 15 February 1946".

The Tripartite Naval Commission, headed by Admirals Robert L. Ghormley for the US, Sir Geoffrey Audley Miles for the UK and Gordey Levchenko for the USSR, began its work in Berlin on 15 August 1945 by appointing a Technical Sub-Committee which had responsibility for making the appropriate recommendations and preparing the allocation lists. This Sub-Committee, in turn, appointed Inspection Parties (also called Tripartite Naval Boards) to undertake the detailed work involved in deciding which ships and submarines would be retained, their allocation between the three Allies, and the disposal arrangements for the remainder.

In August, September and October 1945, the Tripartite Naval Boards, based in Germany, visited the UK, the US, Canada, Trinidad and Norway, as well as Poland and the USSR, inspecting the surrendered ships and U-Boats, and determined which should be recommended to the Technical Sub-Committee and then the TNC for allocation, and therefore transfer, to each of the three Allies.

== See also ==
- Operation Deadlight
