= Type XXI submarine =

German type of submarines

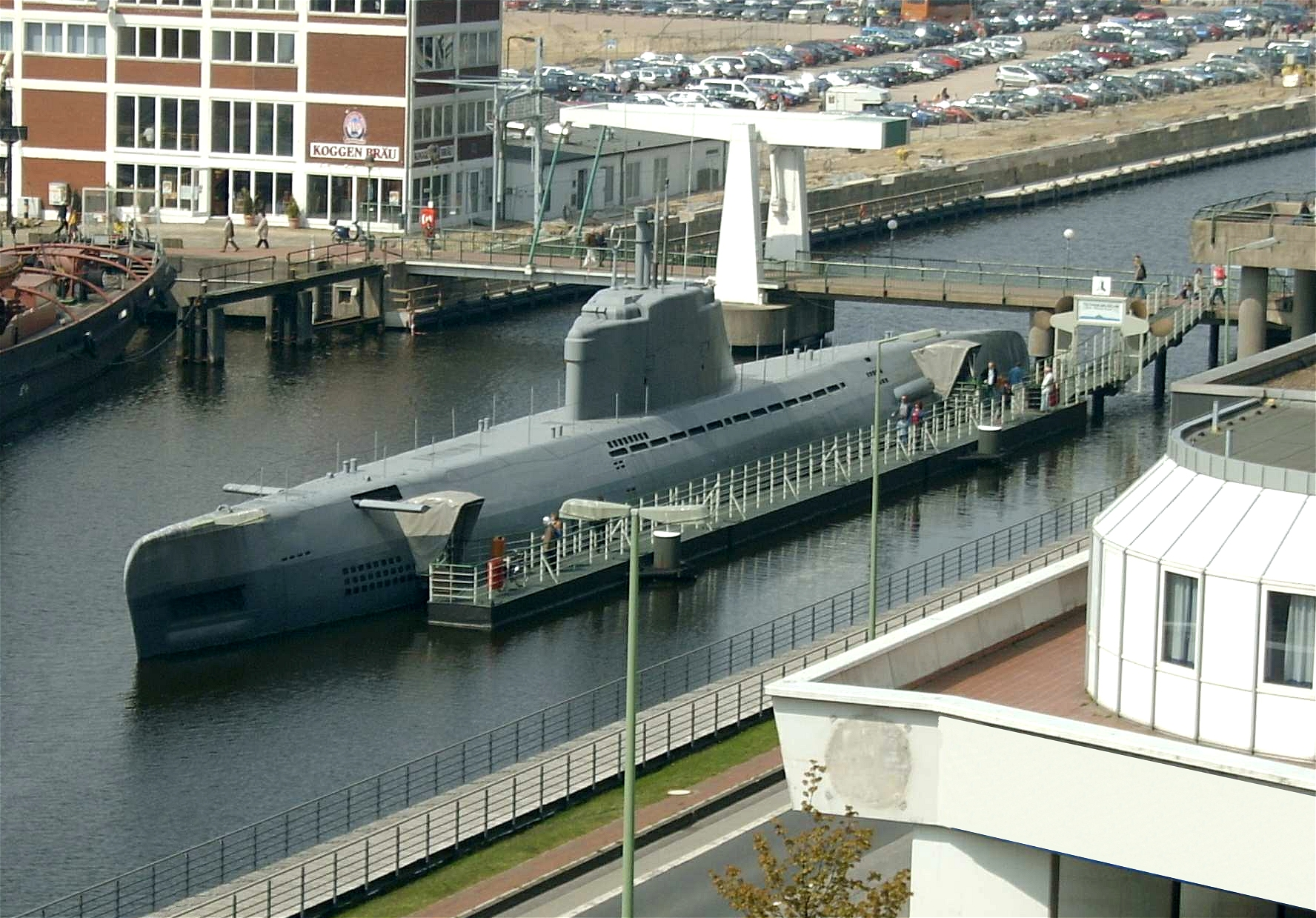
- The preserved Type XXI Wilhelm Bauer exhibited at the Maritime Museum in Bremerhaven.

Class overview
- Name: Type XXI
- Builders: Blohm & Voss; AG Weser; Schichau-Werke
- Operators: Kriegsmarine; Postwar: French Navy; German Navy; Royal Navy; Soviet Navy
- Preceded by: Type VII; Type IX
- Succeeded by: Type XXVI (planned)
- Cost: 5,750,000 ℛ︁ℳ︁ per boat
- Built: 1943–1945
- In commission: 1944–1982
- Planned: 1,170
- Building: 267
- Completed: 118
- Cancelled: 785
- Preserved: 1

General characteristics
- Displacement: 1,621 t (1,595 long tons) surfaced; 1,819 t (1,790 long tons) submerged
- Length: 76.70 m (251 ft 8 in)
- Beam: 8 m (26 ft 3 in)
- Draught: 6.32 m (20 ft 9 in)
- Propulsion: 2× MAN M6V40/46KBB diesel engines, 4,000 PS (3,900 shp; 2,900 kW); 2× SSW GU365/30 electric motors, 5,000 PS (4,900 shp; 3,700 kW); 2 × SSW GV232/28 226 PS (223 shp; 166 kW) for silent running; 2 shafts
- Speed: 15.6 knots (28.9 km/h; 18.0 mph) surfaced; 17.2 knots (31.9 km/h; 19.8 mph) submerged
- Range: 15,500 nmi (28,700 km; 17,800 mi) at 10 knots (19 km/h; 12 mph) surfaced; 340 nmi (630 km; 390 mi) at 5 knots (9.3 km/h; 5.8 mph) submerged
- Complement: 5 officers, 52 men
- Armament: 6 × 53.3 cm (21 in) torpedo tubes; 23 G7 torpedoes; 2 × twin 2 cm (0.79 in) C/30 anti-aircraft guns

Type XXI submarines are a class of diesel–electric U-boats built for Nazi Germany's Kriegsmarine from 1943 to 1945 during the Second World War. The concept of Type XXI submarines emerged in 1943 when it became clear the Type VII and Type IX still being produced, had become obsolete and the designed successor Type XVIII still faced blocking problems with its new propulsion system. They were the first submarines designed to operate primarily submerged, rather than spending most of their time as surface ships that could submerge for brief periods as a means of escaping detection. As they incorporated many batteries to increase the time they could spend submerged, they were sometimes referred to as Elektroboote (German: "electric boats") in the German Navy. They were equipped with a snorkel, which allowed them to cruise at periscope depth on their diesel engines, and recharge their batteries without having to surface. The design included many general improvements as well: much greater underwater speed by an improved hull design, power-assisted torpedo reloading and better crew accommodations.

In order to speed up the delivery of the new U-boats, a new mass production method of assembling prefabricated sections was introduced, and production began before design work was completed. The inexperienced factories which constructed the boats were unable to meet quality standards, and most of the produced U-boats were mechanically unreliable. The massive building program suffered also from the Allied Strategic bombing campaign. One hundred and eighteen Type XXIs were commissioned during the war, (Note: Breyer lists the commissioning dates of 120 Type XXIs. Möller & Brack mention a total of 118 commissioned Type XXI and exclude U-2537 and U-2538 in the enumeration of commissioned U-boats. However, Möller & Brack mention U-2538 in the fate list of commissioned Type XXI.) but only one executed a combat patrol in the last week of the war. After the war, captured Type XXIs were examined by several navies, and many post-war submarine designs were influenced by them. These include the Soviet Whiskey, Chinese Ming, American Tang, British Porpoise, and Swedish Hajen III classes.

== Background ==
A World War II-era submarine relied on diesel engines for surface cruising, and on battery-powered electric engines for underwater travel. Submerged speed and range were limited by the battery capacity. For example, the standard ocean-going U-boat Type VII had a surface range of 8,700 nmi (16,100 km; 10,000 mi) at cruising speed of 10 kn (19 km/h; 12 mph), but a submerged range of only 90 nmi (170 km; 100 mi) at a cruising speed of 4 kn (7.4 km/h; 4.6 mph). A top speed of 8 kn (15 km/h; 9.2 mph) could be maintained for only one hour. Because of these limitations, a submarine was in fact more of a surface vessel with the capability to dive for tactical reasons than a true underwater craft. Once a submarine was detected and submerged, its chances of executing a successful attack were quite low.

In 1933 Hellmuth Walter, a German engineer working at Germaniawerft sought to overcome these limitations, and started to experiment with hydrogen peroxide powered engines for high-speed underwater propulsion. In 1939 Walter received a contract to build the experimental submarine V-80 which in the autumn of 1940 could achieve an underwater speed of 28.1 knots (52.0 km/h; 32.3 mph) with an air-independent propulsion system consisting of a hydrogen peroxide powered steam turbine. A diesel-electric powered submarine spent most of its time on the surface cruising on diesel engines and its outer hull was that of a classic surface ship, but as the Walter turbine provided high underwater speeds, a more streamlined outer hull was needed for submerged cruising. The V-80 had a fish-like hull with a smooth exterior.

At this time, the German Navy was reluctant to divert many resources into developing this experimental concept into a practical design. The existing U-boat types could still offer adequate performance, whilst it would take at least three years before this experimental design could be put into use. Only in February 1942, Karl Dönitz, the head of the German Navy, realised that this alternative submerged propulsion might be the answer to the growing threat of Allied long-range aircraft escorting convoys and patrolling the bay of Biscay. He ordered four small, experimental Type XVII Walter U-boats, and one slightly larger ocean-going vessel, the ocean-going U-791. By September 1942 these U-boats were still under design and there were still many issues to be solved before the propulsion system could be used on combat U-boats. However, as it was realised that the existing U-boat types would soon become obsolete, a further twenty-four Type XVII were ordered and, well before the lessons learnt from the small Walter U-boats could be incorporated into the design, two prototypes for a large 1500-ton ocean-going Type XVIII Walter U-boat were ordered.

In April 1943, Allied advances in radar, HF/DF and long-range air escort finally rendered the existing U-boat types fighting the battle of the Atlantic completely obsolete. A U-boat type with better performance was urgently needed, but the Walter U-boat project was far from ready: Germany lacked the resources to produce the hydrogen peroxide needed for these turbines, which consumed far more fuel than a U-boat could store in her tanks. There remained also many mechanical and practical teething problems with the Walter-turbine so alternate solutions were investigated. (Note: Both the UK and USSR continued the German experiments but did not manage to make hydrogen peroxide a reliable propellant for submarine engines. Hydrogen peroxide was used as a propellant for torpedoes but the British discontinued with this after an accident in 1959. The loss of the Russian submarine Kursk in August 2000 was caused by the explosion of an onboard hydrogen peroxide torpedo.) German engineers took up the idea of using the large turbine room and hydrogen peroxide tank space of these Type XVII and Type XVIII U-boats to install larger electric engines and extra battery cells, which would vastly increase underwater speed and range. On 19 June 1943, the German Navy ordered these ideas to be worked out as a new Type XXI submarine, which was to replace the Type IX submarine, and on 29 June Dönitz approved the Type XXI as the successor for the Type VII for operations against the North-Atlantic convoys.

== Design ==
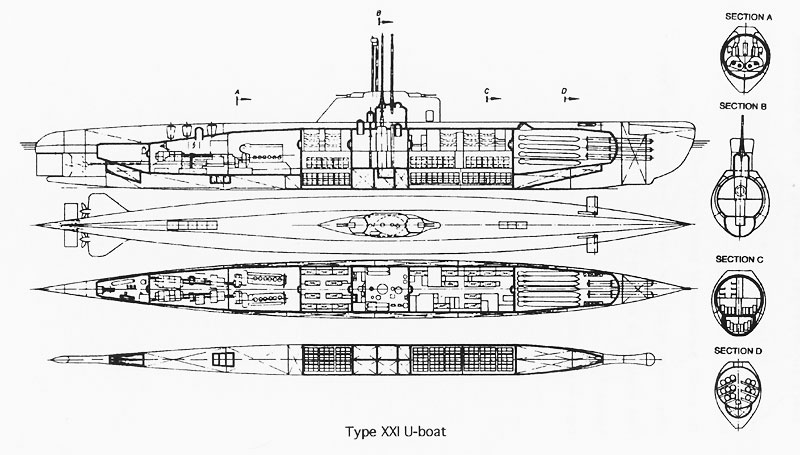
US Navy diagram of a Type XXI U-boat. Note the teardrop-shaped fairing for the large hydrophone array beneath the bow and the wasp-waist pressure hull.

Using the Type XVIII design for the hull, armament, and control systems, and the new supercharged diesel engine intended for the Type VIIC/42 submarine, the Type XXI was underpowered and slower on the surface than its predecessors the Type VII and Type IX, but low surface speed was not considered a problem. Being designed primarily for submerged use, the Type XXI's maximum surface speed (15.6 knots) was lower than that of the Type IX (18.2 knots) but its submerged speed was more than twice that of the Type IX (17.2 knots versus 7.7 knots), because they were equipped with much more powerful electric drive motors and had less drag. With its superior submerged speed and endurance, a Type XXI could position itself undetected for a convoy attack, and with a new quick-loading device, it could fire eighteen torpedoes in twenty minutes.

The main features of the Type XXI were the hydrodynamically streamlined hull and conning tower and the large number of battery cells, roughly triple that of the Type VII. This gave these boats great underwater range and dramatically reduced the time spent on or near the surface. They could travel submerged at about 5 knots (9.3 km/h; 5.8 mph) for about 75 hours before recharging batteries, which took less than five hours using the snorkel due to the new supercharged diesel engines.

The Type XXI was also much quieter than the VIIC, making it more difficult to detect when submerged, and the design eliminated protruding components that had created drag in earlier models. The ability to outrun many surface ships while submerged, combined with improved dive times (also a product of the new hull form), made the Type XXI much more difficult to pursue and destroy. It could sprint when positioning for an attack, while older boats had to surface to sprint into position. This often revealed a boat's location, especially after aircraft became available for convoy escort. The Type XXI was also equipped with a pair of electric "creep motors" for silent running. In addition, the Type XXIs had better facilities than previous U-boat classes, with much roomier crew berths, and a freezer to prevent food spoilage.

== Characteristics ==
Type XXIs had an overall length of 76.60 m (251 ft 4 in) The boats' beam was 8.00 m (26 ft 3 in), the draught was 6.32 m (20 ft 9 in), with a height of 11.34 m (37 ft 2 in). The pressure hull had a length of 60.50 m (198 ft 6 in) and had a width of 5.30 m (17 ft 5 in). The boats displaced 1,621 tonnes (1,595 long tons) when surfaced and 1,819 t (1,790 long tons) when submerged. The complement consisted of five officers and fifty-two enlisted men. Constructional, test and crush diving depth were 133 m (436 ft), 200 m (660 ft) and 330 m (1,080 ft) respectively. (Note: German U-boat construction used a safety factor of 2.5, which meant that crush diving depth was 2.5 times construction diving depth. Test diving depth used a safety factor of 1.5.)

=== Propulsion ===
As the emphasis was laid on enhanced submerged performance, Siemens-Schuckert designed new GU265/30 double-acting electric motors which were more powerful than the diesel engines. Two of these large electrical motors were installed in the original walter-turbine compartment, together with two small GW323/28 electrical motors for slow silent running. The Type XXI had two MAN six-cylinder four-stroke M6V40/46KBB diesel engines with a total of 4,000 metric horsepower (2,942 kW; 3,945 bhp) for use on the surface and two double-acting electric motors with a total of 4,100 kW (5,574 PS; 5,498 shp) for underwater use. These engines powered two shafts, which gave the boats a top surface speed of 15.6 knots (28.9 km/h; 18.0 mph) and 17.2 knots (31.9 km/h; 19.8 mph) when submerged. Cruising range was 15,500 nautical miles (28,700 km; 17,800 mi) at 10 knots (19 km/h; 12 mph) on the surface and 340 nautical miles (630 km; 390 mi) at 5 knots (9.3 km/h; 5.8 mph) submerged.

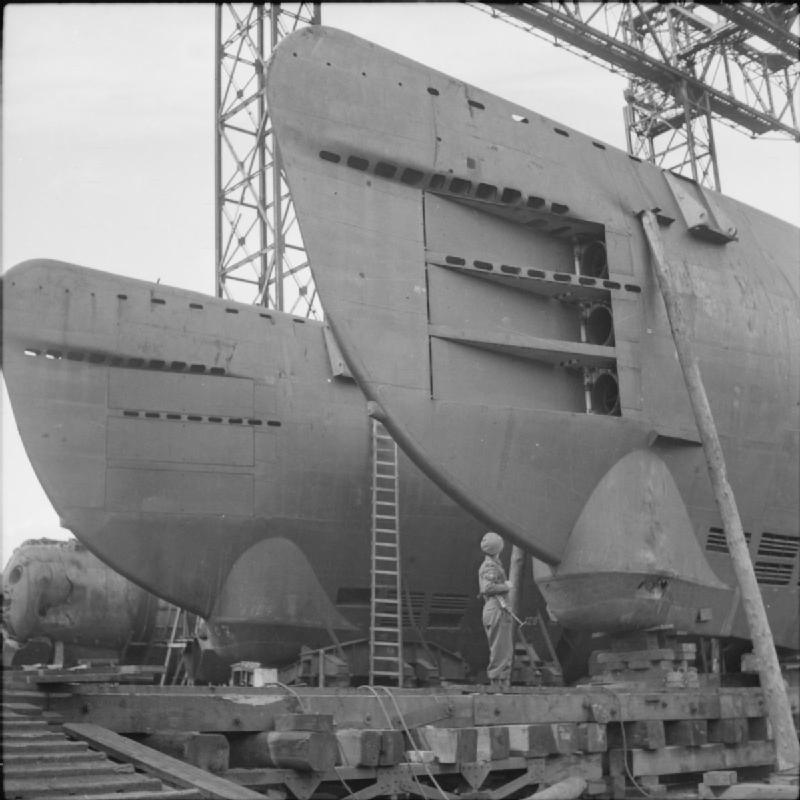
Two Type XXI bow sections, showing the 'balcony' at the bottom

=== Armament ===
The Type XXI was the first U-boat to be equipped with six bow torpedo tubes, but had no stern torpedo tube. Six torpedoes were carried within the tubes and another seventeen could be stored in racks immediately behind the tubes. Reloading was done by hoisting a torpedo on a rail hanging from the upper pressure hull. An electrically powered trolley could push the torpedo into the torpedo tube much faster than had been possible in manual reloading. A full second salvo of six torpedoes was possible five to six minutes after the first salvo, and a third salvo could be fired within twenty minutes. It was intended to make it possible to substitute twelve mines for four torpedoes. Four torpedo tubes could contain three mines each and eject these mines with compressed air. But no Type XXI was ever equipped with the needed minelaying gear. The anti-aircraft armament consisted of two twin 2 cm C/38 guns, mounted in two turrets on the enclosed bridge. The design of this enclosed bridge and anti-aircraft turrets came from the Type XVII. As designed, these turrets were equipped with twin 3 cm M44 guns, but the development of these new guns was delayed and instead the well-proven but obsolete 2 cm C/38 was installed.

=== Sensors ===
Just like all other U-boat types, the Type XXI was equipped with a passive sound listening device, the Gruppenhorchgerät, often abbreviated to GHG. Until 1943 the sensors of the GHG in a U-boat were mounted as far as possible below the waterline towards the bow, with the receiver membranes fitted into the hull plating. In order to give the GHG a better performance, and to allow the GHG to be used at higher submerged speeds, the sensors for the Type XXI were mounted in a 'balcony', a round construction protruding from the keel at the bows. The receivers were arranged in two horizontal 'horseshoe' lines, which allowed even accurate sound location in all directions except the sector right aft. This arrangement allowed the GHG to be used effectively both surfaced and submerged at all depths. The increased submerged speed of the Type XXI necessitated the installation of the receivers behind 3 mm (0.12 in) steel plates. The range of the GHG depended much on the size and speed of the target, but a ship moving at 10 knots could be detected at a range of minimum 4 nmi (7.4 km; 4.6 mi) with an accuracy of 1 degree.

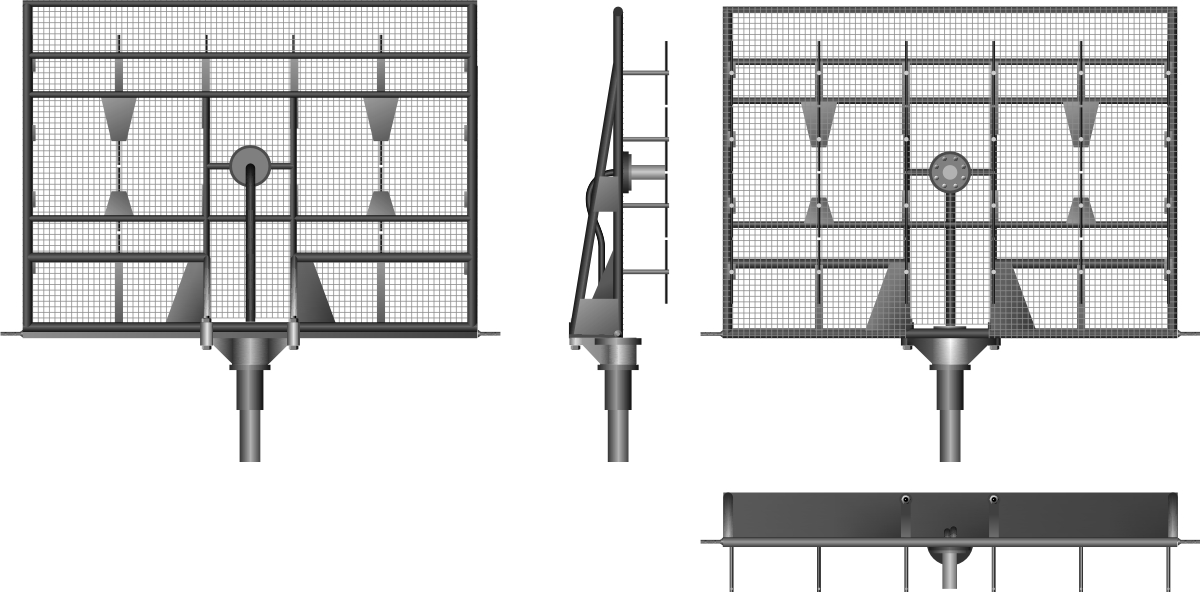
Radar Transmitter Type F432 D2

The GHG could not give bearings and distance to target accurate enough for torpedo firing control. As it was intended that the Type XXI attack submerged without the use of periscopes, an active sonar called 'S-gerät' was installed for this purpose. The S-gerät has a radius of 8 nmi (15 km; 9.2 mi). Because the sound pulses of the S-Gerät could give away the presence of a U-boat, target acquisition was done with the GHG and the S-gerät was only activated when the attack started.

The Type XXI boats were fitted with the FuMO 65 Hohentwiel U1 with the Type F432 D2 radar transmitter. It was intended to install a FuMO 84 Berlin II and FuMO 391 Lessing as from the summer of 1945. The FuMo 84 was a retractable, tactical radar with a wavelength of 9 cm, which could be operated at periscope depth, whilst the FuMO 391 was an air search radar operating at a wavelength of 2.4m.

== Construction ==
=== Section building ===
On 6 July 1943 the first orders for 102 Type XXI were placed at six yards, with expected delivery of three prototypes in November 1944 and expected start of series production by March 1945. These U-boats would not be ready for operational use before 1946. Since new U-boats were instrumental in trying to regain the initiative in the Battle of the Atlantic, Karl Dönitz the commander of the German Navy asked Albert Speer, the Minister of Armaments to find a way to speed up construction. Otto Merker was appointed by Speer as head of the Committee of Ship Construction and with his experience in the automobile industry, he introduced the concept of prefabricated section assembly in U-boat building. Merker expected that with this new building method, the first delivery of a Type XXI could be put forward to April 1944, with series production of thirty U-boats a month starting in August 1944.

The hull of the Type XXI was split into eight sections, the conning tower superstructure was added as a ninth section. Construction and assembly of these sections was executed in three steps: first crude sections were constructed at steel factory sites scattered all over Germany. These crude sections were then transported to section yards where equipment was installed. Finally these sections were assembled at ship yards. Three ship yards were selected for assembly: Blohm & Voss of Hamburg, AG Weser of Bremen and Schichau-Werke of Danzig. This new method allowed for a theoretical construction time of less than six months per vessel. In practice all the assembled U-boats were plagued with severe quality problems that required extensive post-production work and time to rectify. One of the reasons for these shortcomings was that crude sections were made by companies having little experience with shipbuilding.

=== Building program ===
The first orders were placed on 6 November 1943, with a planned monthly assembly of twelve U-boats at Bremen, thirteen at Hamburg and eight at Danzig. Between August and December 1944 the assembly at Bremen would gradually shift from the AG Weser to the Bremer Vulkan yard in the Valentin submarine pens, a massive bomb–proof concrete bunker. The pens were constructed between 1943 and 1945 using more than 12,000 foreign forced labourers, concentration camp prisoners and prisoners of war, of whom more than 4,000 died because of malnutrition, exhaustion and maltreatment.

The building program suffered problems from the onset: strategic bombing disrupted the production of the crude sections, diesel engines and electric motors. Crude sections were produced at the steel yards with too much tolerance on the diameter of the pressure hull leading to additional work in the section yards. On 10 March 1944 it was acknowledged that no more than sixty-three U-boats could be delivered by August 1944. Further problems were discovered during or after assembly: many electrical systems had been replaced with hydraulic equivalents, but experience was lacking for installing these. The diesel supercharger proved useless for submerged snorkel propulsion, so as surface propulsion was only of secondary importance, the superchargers were abandoned, but this left the boat with far less diesel power.

The Naval Construction program of 1 June 1944 included the building of 580 Type XXI, with 155 built in 1944 and a monthly production of twenty-two units in 1945. Shortages of skilled labour at the yards and problems with sections arriving incomplete at the assembly yards led to the revised construction program of 7 September which reduced the number to be built in 1944 to 120. Allied air attacks continued to disrupt industrial production and the transport of materials. From September 1944, the Allied advance from Paris to the Rhine threatened the Ruhr industrial area, which caused a sharp decline in steel deliveries to the construction yards. As a consequence the building programme had to be revised and downscaled every few weeks. Neither Speer nor Merkel were able to mitigate any of these problems and resorted to force and threats in order to keep the building program on track. On 1 October 1944 the yard director of Bremen Deschimag was arrested and imprisoned for criticising the section building method and the unrealistic production goals.

Finally in February 1945 Merkel decided to cancel most of the Type XXI back orders and focus on assembling the already produced sections. In March the yard in Danzig was evacuated before the Russian advance. At Bremen, daily Mosquito precision bombardments brought the construction at the Deschimag yard to a virtual standstill and the transfer of the U-boat assembly to the Valentin shelter was thwarted by the destruction of these bunkers with Grand Slam "earthquake" bombs.

Type XXI series
Series	Yard	Date ordered	nbr ordered	nbr commissioned		
Series	Yard	Date ordered	nbr ordered	lost	scuttled	captured
U-2501 - U-2631	Blohm & Voss, Hamburg	6 Nov 1943	131	9	34	6
U-2632 - U-2762	Blohm & Voss, Hamburg	6 May 1944	119	0	0	0
U-3001 - U-3088	Deschimag, Bremen	6 Nov 1943	88	5	32	4
U-3089 - U-3100	Deschimag, Bremen	6 May 1944	12	0	0	0
U-3101 - U-3176	Bremer Vulkan Farge	6 May 1944	76	0	0	0
U-3177 - U-3295	Bremer Vulkan Farge	27 Sep 1944	119	0	0	0
U-3501 - U-3571	Schichau, Danzig	6 Nov 1943	71	6	22	2
U-3572 - U-3642	Schichau, Danzig	6 May 1944	71	0	0	0
U-3643 - U-3695	Schichau, Danzig	27 Sep 1944	53	0	0	0
Totals			740	120		
Totals			740	20	88	12

== Evaluation ==
A post-war assessment of the Type XXI by the United States Navy concluded that while the design had some admirable features, it was seriously flawed. The engines were underpowered, which limited the surface speed and increased the time required to charge the batteries. The hydraulic system was unduly complex, and its main elements were located outside the pressure hull. This made the system highly vulnerable to corrosion and damage. The snorkel was also badly designed, and difficult to use in practice. The submarines had poor structural integrity due to the manufacturing problems. This rendered the submarines highly vulnerable to depth charges, and gave them a lesser maximum diving depth than earlier U-boat designs. Due to the combination of design and construction problems, journalist Clay Blair judged that "the XXI could not have made a big difference in the Battle of the Atlantic.

== Wartime and post-war service ==
=== Germany ===
Towards April 1945, some Type XXIs sailed from Germany to Norway as ports were evacuated before advancing Allied armies arrived. Only U-2511 sailed from Norway for a war patrol in the last week of the war. After an abortive attempt on 18 April, she sailed on 30 April. When on 4 May she received the order to cease hostilities, U-2511 returned to Norway. On her return voyage, U-2511 came across the heavy cruiser HMS Norfolk, made a practice attack but withheld fire. (Note: Some sources mention U-3008 as the second Type XXI going on a war patrol, but Blair does not mention U-3008 going on patrol, and does not mention U-3008 in appendix 1 which lists all U-boats assigned to combat, nor in appendix 2 which lists all war patrols. Blair also explicitly states U-2511 was the only Type XXI assigned to a war patrol.)

During 1957, U-2540, which had been scuttled at the end of the war, was raised and refitted as research vessel Wilhelm Bauer of the Bundesmarine. It was operated by both military and civilian crews for research purposes until 1982. During 1984, it was made available for display to the public by the Deutsches Schiffahrtsmuseum (German Maritime Museum) in Bremerhaven, Germany.

=== France ===
U-2518 surrendered to the British, but the U-boat was allocated to the French. She was towed in January 1946 to Cherbourg and commissioned on 9 April 1951 in the French Navy as Roland Morillot. The submarine was used for active service during the Suez Crisis in 1956. She remained in commission until 1967 and was scrapped in 1969.

=== Soviet Union ===
Four Type XXI boats were assigned to the USSR by the Potsdam Agreement; these were U-2529, U-3035, U-3041, and U-3515, which were commissioned into the Soviet Navy as B-27, B-28, B-29, and B-30 (later B-100) respectively. However, Western intelligence believed the Soviets had acquired several more Type XXI boats; a review by the US Joint Intelligence Committee for the Joint Chiefs of Staff during January 1948 estimated the Soviet Navy then had 15 Type XXIs operational, could complete construction of 6 more within 2 months, and could build another 39 within a year and a half from prefabricated sections, since several factories producing Type XXI components and the assembly yard at Danzig had been captured by the Soviets at the end of World War II. U-3538 — U-3557 (respectively TS-5 – TS-19 and TS-32 – TS-38) remained incomplete at Danzig and were scrapped or sunk during 1947. The four boats assigned by Potsdam were used in trials and tests until 1955, then scuttled or used for weapon testing between 1958 and 1973.

=== United Kingdom ===
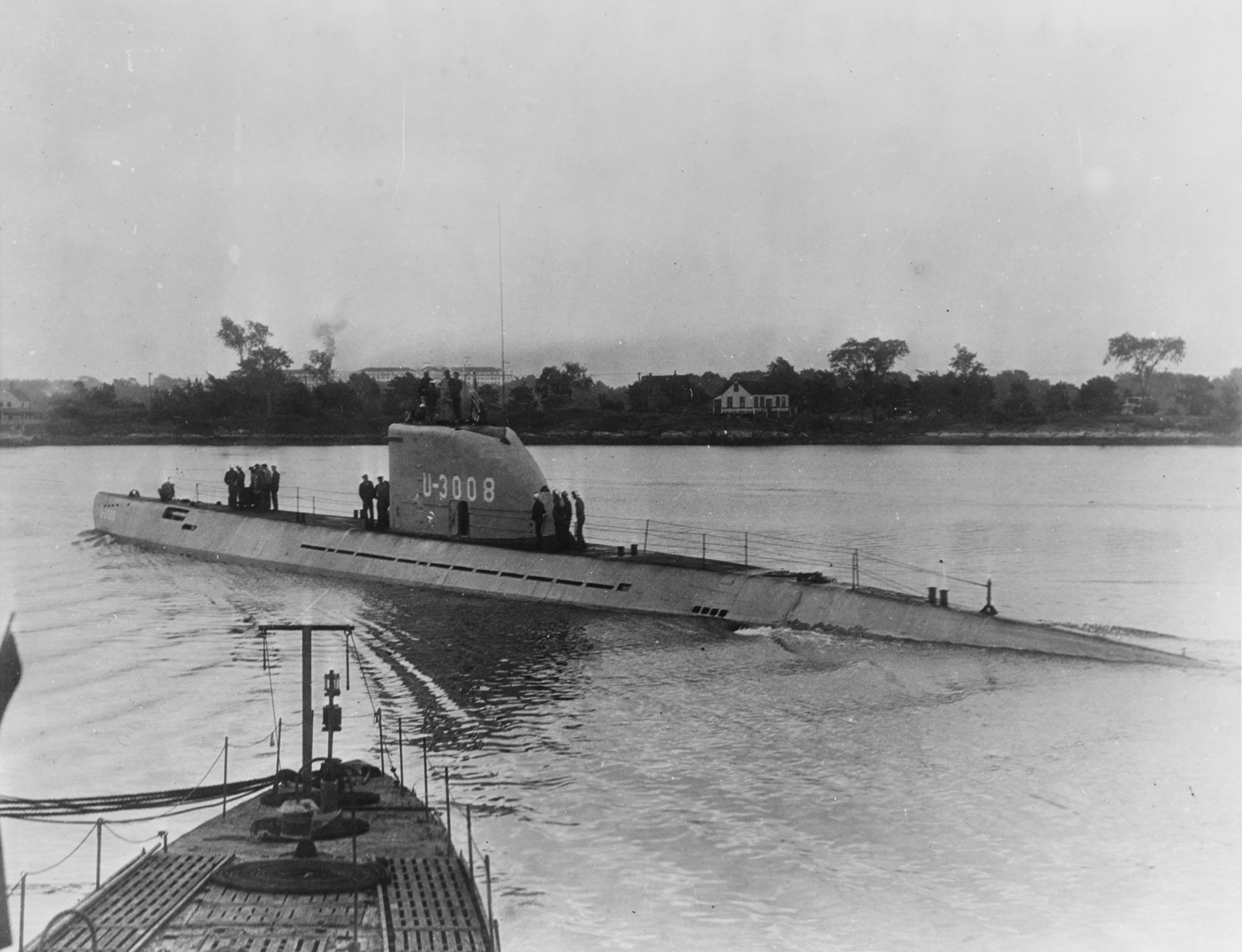
German submarine U-3008 in Portsmouth Naval Shipyard, Kittery, Maine

After the German surrender on 8 May 1945, the British captured five Type XXI in Norway, and renamed them: U-3515, U-2529, U-3035, U-3041 and U-3017 became respectively N-27, N-28, N-29, N-30 and N-41. The first four were transferred to the Soviet Navy in February 1946, N-41 was used for tests until scrapped in November 1949 at Newport.

=== United States ===
The United States Navy acquired U-2513 and U-3008. These two U-boats were stationed in Portsmouth, Virginia, but they were not commissioned in the Navy. During November 1946 President Harry S. Truman visited U-2513; the submarine dived to 440 feet (130 m) with the President aboard. In 1947 the two submarines were allocated to an operational development force and underwent tests and trials. These tests and trials ended in the summer of 1948 for U-3008, U-2513 continued for another year before both submarines were used as targets for weapon trials. U-2513 was sunk as a target on 7 October 1951 by the destroyer USS Robert A. Owens. U-3008 was blown up in May 1952.

== Notable wrecks ==
- On 3 May 1945 U-2505, U-3004, and U-3506 were scuttled in the damaged "Elbe II" U-boat bunker in Hamburg. They were partially scrapped in 1950. It was intended to bury these U-boats under the remains of the bunker, but demolition attempts succeeded only in bringing the roof down on the U-boats. The bunker has since been filled in with sand and covered with earth.
- U-2513 is in 213 feet (65 m) of water, 70 nautical miles (130 km) west of Key West, Florida. The boat has been visited by divers, but the depth makes this very difficult and the site is considered suitable for only advanced divers.
- In April 2018 the wreck of U-3523 was found north of Skagen in Denmark.

== Influences ==
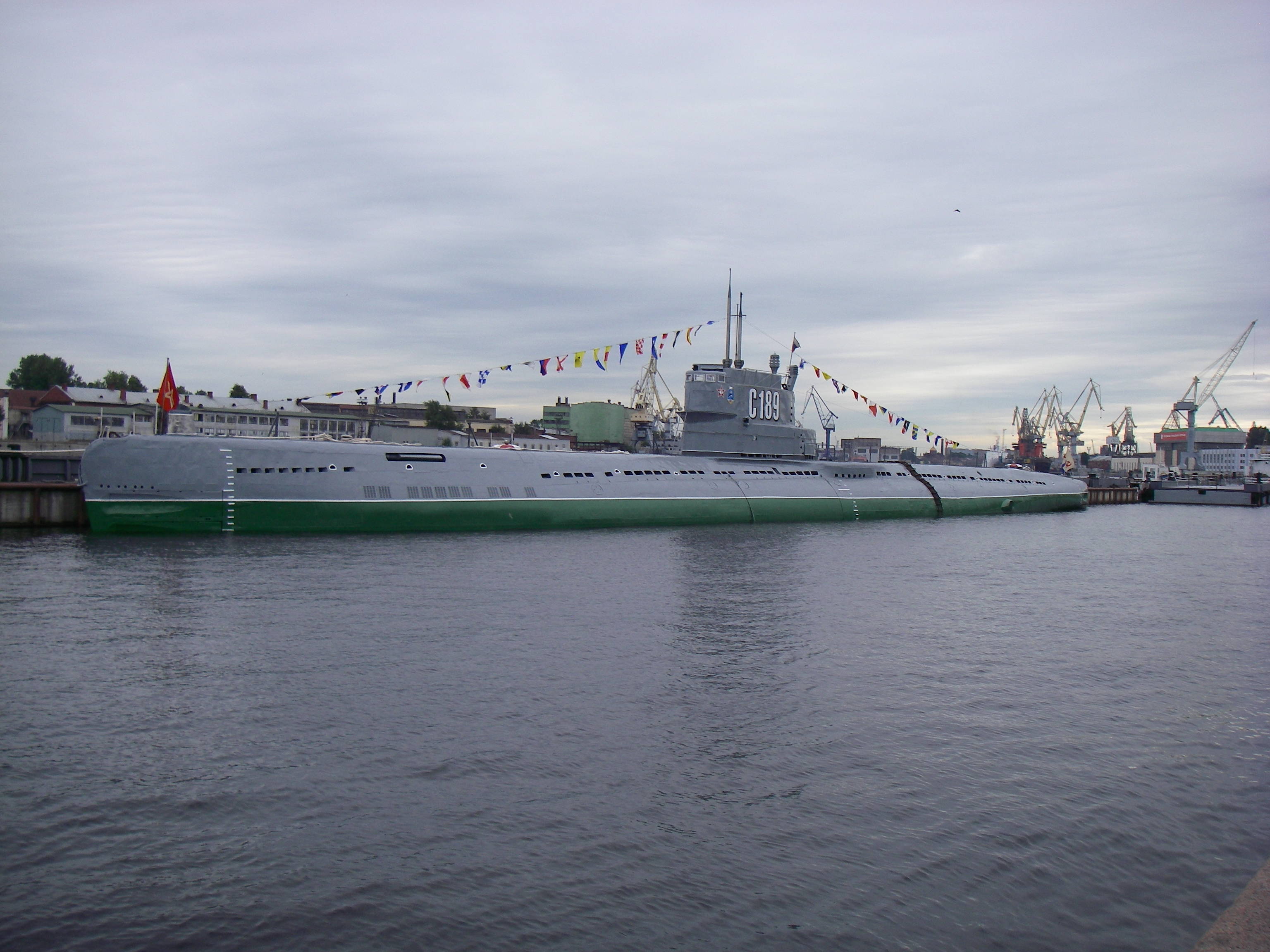
The Soviet Whiskey-class submarine S-189

The Type XXI design directly influenced advanced post-war submarines:

- The Greater Underwater Propulsion Power Program (GUPPY) improvements to the United States Gato, Balao and Tench-class submarines
- Several Soviet design projects, Projects 611, 613, 614, 633, and 644. These projects became known by their NATO codes as Zulu, Whiskey and Romeo submarine classes.
- The Chinese-built Romeo-class submarines, and the subsequent Ming class.
- The British Porpoise-class submarine were the first post-war combat submarines built in Britain. Their design incorporated the lessons learned in the second World War, but also the results of the examinations of the captured Type XXIs.
- The Swedish were neutral in World War II and did not gain much insight on contemporary submarine development. However, at the end of the war the Type XXI U-3503 scuttled itself close to Gothenburg. The U-boat was subsequently raised and studied by the Swedish. Between 1954 and 1957, they produced six Hajen III-class submarines which were at 720 tons much smaller, but had a Type XXI style hull and battery capacity.

== See also ==
- List of Type XXI submarines
- British R-class submarine
- I-201-class submarine
