= FuG 200 Hohentwiel =

Luftwaffe maritime patrol radar system

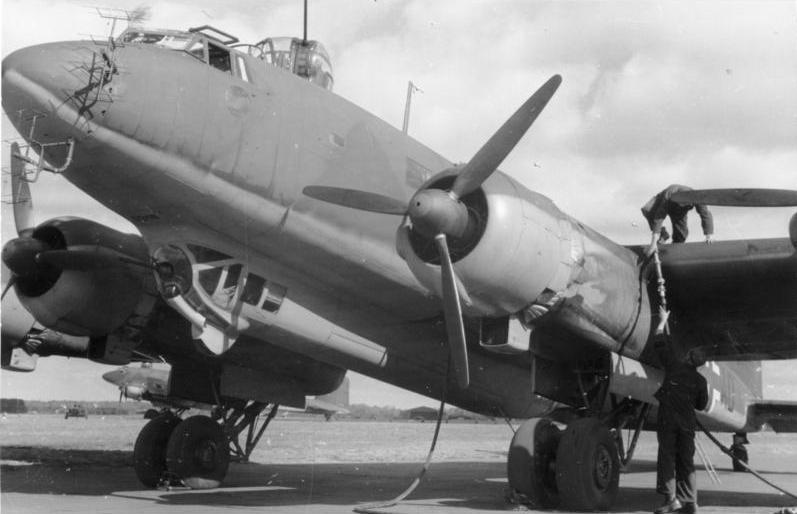
- Fw 200C with triple radar antenna arrays for its FuG 200 installation
- Country of origin: Germany
- Introduced: 1938-1945
- Type: Airborne search
- Frequency: 525–575 MHz/57.1-52.1 cm (low UHF-band)
- PRF: 50 Hz
- Pulsewidth: 2 μs
- Range: • 10 km (6.2 mi) Submarines • 70 km (43 mi) Surface Ships • 150 km (93 mi) Land
- Azimuth: left 30°, middle, right 30°
- Power: 24V 30A, Synchronous inverter

FuMO 61 Hohentwiel U & FuMO 65 Hohentwiel U1
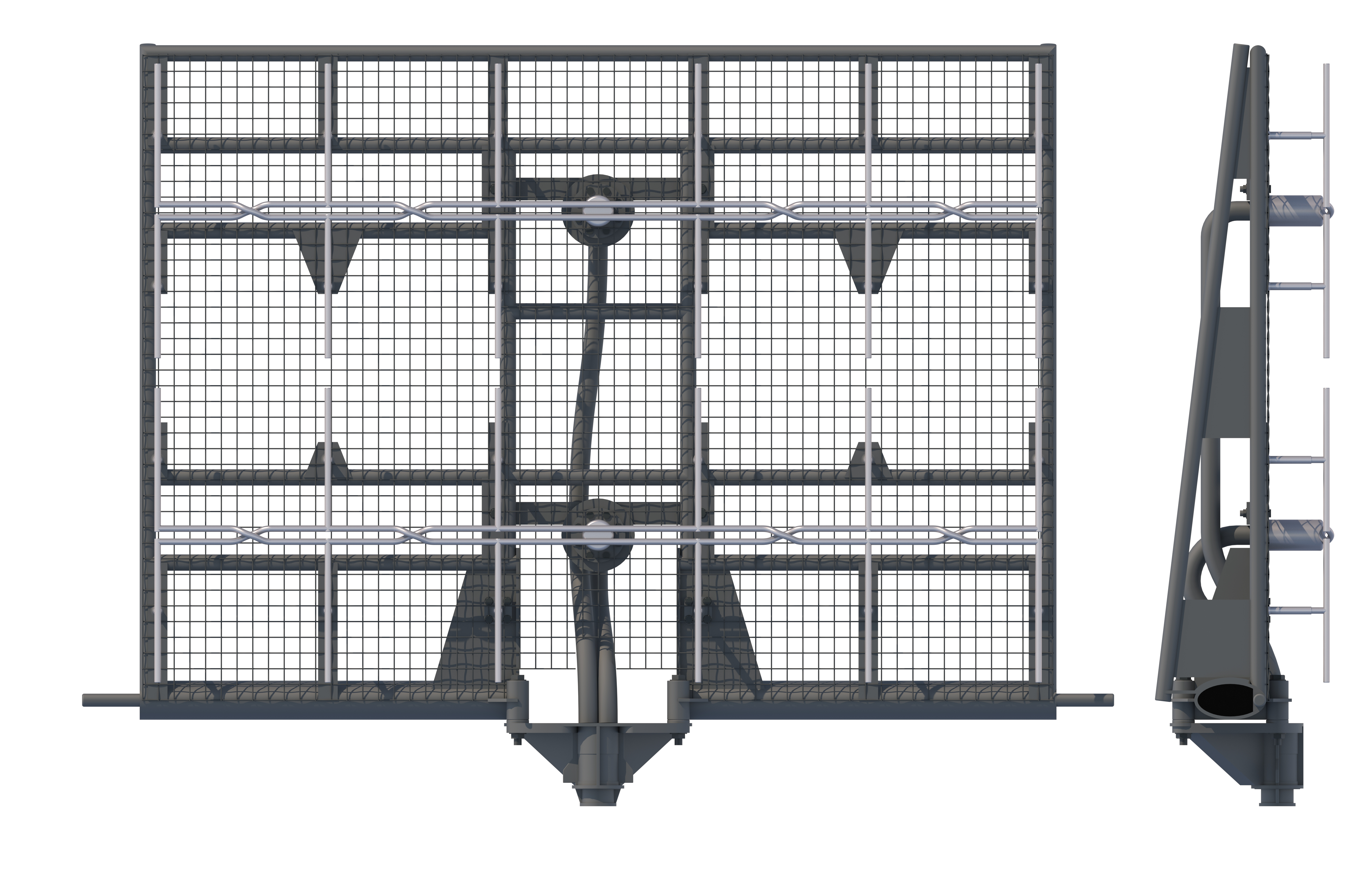
- FuMO 61 Hohentwiel U
- Country of origin: Germany
- Introduced: 1943-1945
- Type: U-boat surface search
- Frequency: 556 MHz/53.9 cm
- Range: • 10 km (6.2 mi) Surface Ships * 25 km (16 mi) Aircraft

The FuG 200 Hohentwiel was a low-UHF band frequency maritime patrol radar system of the Luftwaffe in World War II. It was developed by C. Lorenz AG of Berlin starting in 1938 under the code name "Hohentwiel", an extinct volcano in the region of Baden-Württemberg in southern Germany.

Originally developed as an anti-aircraft radar for the Luftwaffe, it lost out to the Würzburg for this role. In 1941, it was modified as an airborne surface search radar for naval patrol aircraft like the Focke-Wulf Fw 200. In 1944 it was further adapted for shipborne use, used on late-war U-boats, some surface ships, and land based installations.

== Development ==
The device had originally been entered into a design contest held by the Luftwaffe for the new FuMG 40L (ground-based fire-control radar). When competitor Telefunken won that contract with its "Würzburg radar" in 1939, the device was shelved.

In 1941, Lorenz started to re-design it for another design contest by the Reichsluftfahrtministerium for an airborne naval search radar. As no specific antenna had been specified, initially the simplest possible layout with three transversely-arranged antenna arrays was chosen - the central one for transmitting and two others for receiving, one each to port and starboard of the central transmitting array. Each antenna array possessed sixteen horizontally-oriented dipole elements, in eight sets of two elements each, with each set of four dipole groups vertically stacked comprising each array. To determine which side a target lay on, the radio operator had to manually switch the receiving arrays to find the stronger signal. Later, the device received a motor-driven antenna switch. The received signal strength was displayed on a cathode ray tube so the observer or pilot could roughly gauge the target's heading as 'left', 'right' or 'head on'. The maximum range was 150 km for convoys on the Atlantic. The device was first deployed on Junkers Ju 88, Focke-Wulf Fw 200 and other maritime patrol aircraft and twin-engined torpedo bomber designs, and is known to have been fitted to Heinkel He 111 medium bombers for training purposes, and experimented with on the Heinkel He 177A. In order to avoid capture after a crash, it was fitted with several small self-destruct explosive charges in each of the system's electronics cabinets, which could be triggered by the pilot.

== Naval use ==
In 1943, Lorenz was instructed to adapt Hohentwiel for naval use, and soon the Hohentwiel appeared on U-boats, small surface ships, and coastal installations.

There are two U-boat versions of the FuG 200 Hohentwiel used during World War II; FuMO 61 Hohentwiel U and the FuMO 65 Hohentwiel U1. The U-boat versions were easier to maintain and more reliable compared with the other versions. However, the U-boat versions had several disadvantages: the smaller antenna and the height of the antenna. The antenna was smaller as it had to fit within a small area on the port side of the conning tower. In addition, the reduced height of the antenna installation impaired the range. Both U-boat versions had ranges of between 8 and 10 kilometres (5.0 and 6.2 mi) for naval targets and between 15 and 25 kilometres (9.3 and 15.5 mi) at an altitude of 200 metres (660 ft). Resolution was about 3 degrees, and at short range its range accuracy was 100 metres (330 ft). Both U-boat versions operated at a frequency 556 MHz and had four rows of six dipoles. Before the U-boat could dive, the antenna needed to be retracted into a well on the conning tower. Both U-boat antenna versions were 1,400 mm (4 ft 7 in) wide by 1,000 mm (3 ft 3 in) in height, and total overall dimensions of the antenna frame was 1,540 by 1,022 mm (5 ft 0.6 in by 3 ft 4.2 in).

There are two types of radar transmitter for the FuMO-61 Hohentwiel U and FuMO-65 Hohentwiel U1, the Type F431 C1 and the Type F432 D2. The Type F431 C1 was used on the Type VII, Type IX and the Type F432 D2 on the Type XXI.

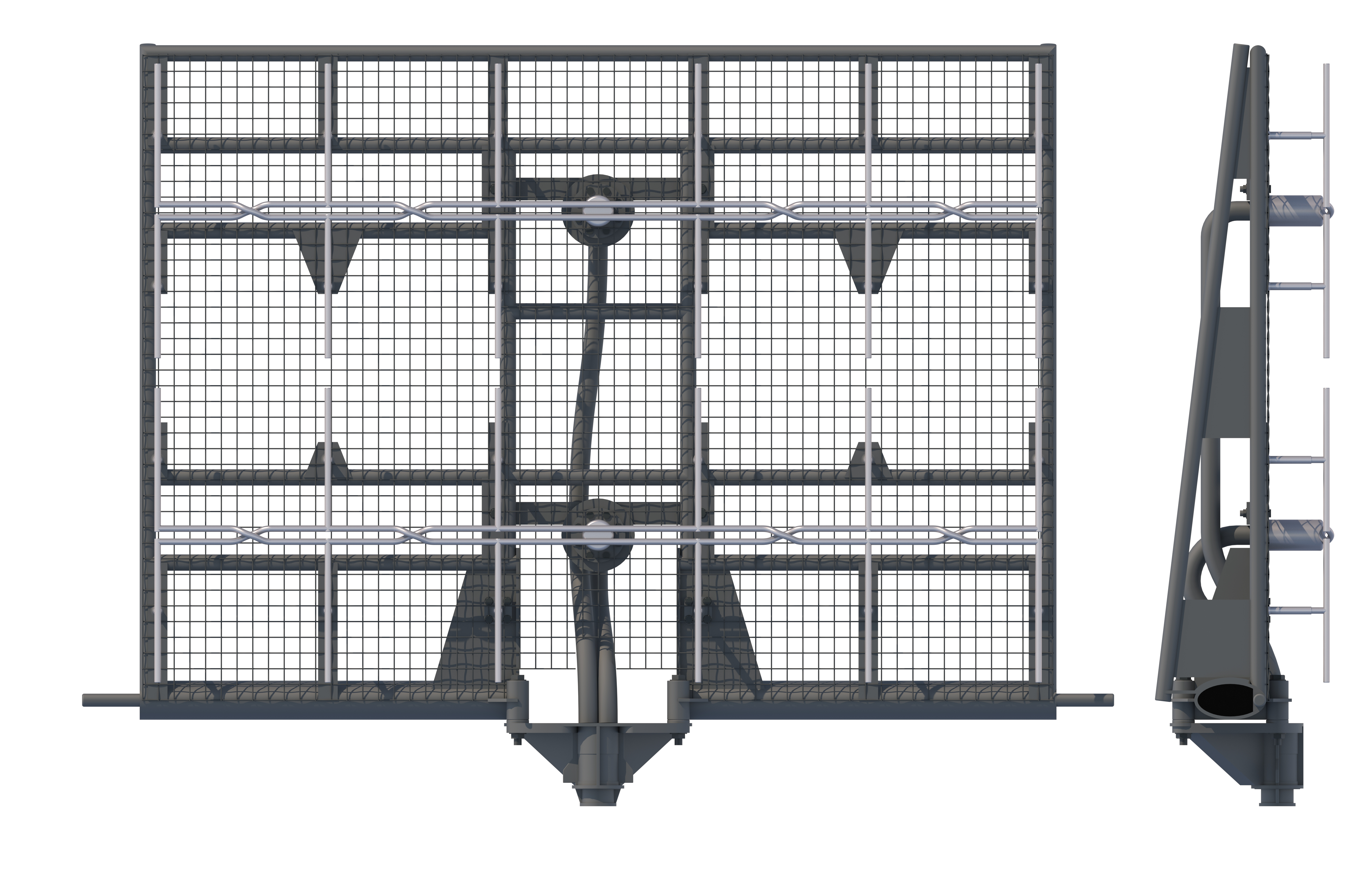
Radar Transmitter Type F431 C1

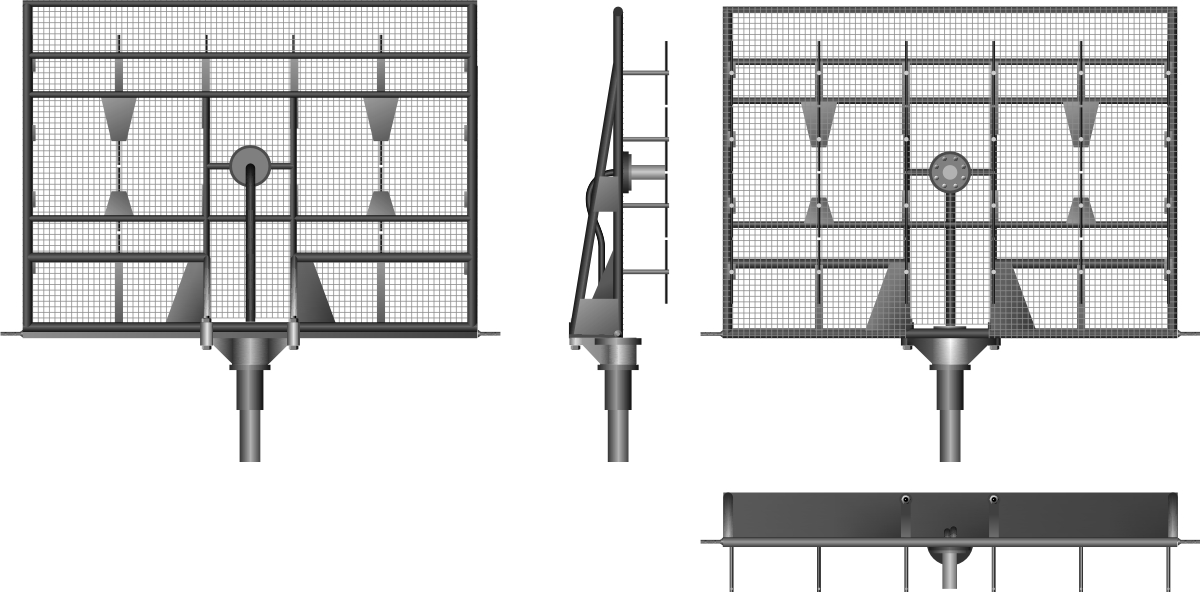
Radar Transmitter Type F432 D2

=== FuMO 61 Hohentwiel U ===
The FuMO 61 Hohentwiel U was the marine version of the FuG 200 Hohentwiel used by the Kriegsmarine on Type VII, Type IX and Type XXI U-boats. Beginning March 1944, it began to be installed on Type VII and Type IX.

=== FuMO 63 Hohentwiel K ===
The FuMO 63 Hohentwiel K became available at the beginning of 1944. It was fitted to the foremast and mainmast of surface warships.

=== FuMO 65 Hohentwiel U1 ===
The FuMO 65 Hohentwiel U1 was the marine version of the FuG 200 Hohentwiel used by the Kriegsmarine only on Type XXI U-boats. The FuMO 65 Hohentwiel U1 had an updated radar display over the older FuMO 61 Hohentwiel U, it had a Plan position indicator display, known to the Germans as Drauf.

== Image gallery ==
Air force manual with full technical specification

US intelligence assessment of captured devices

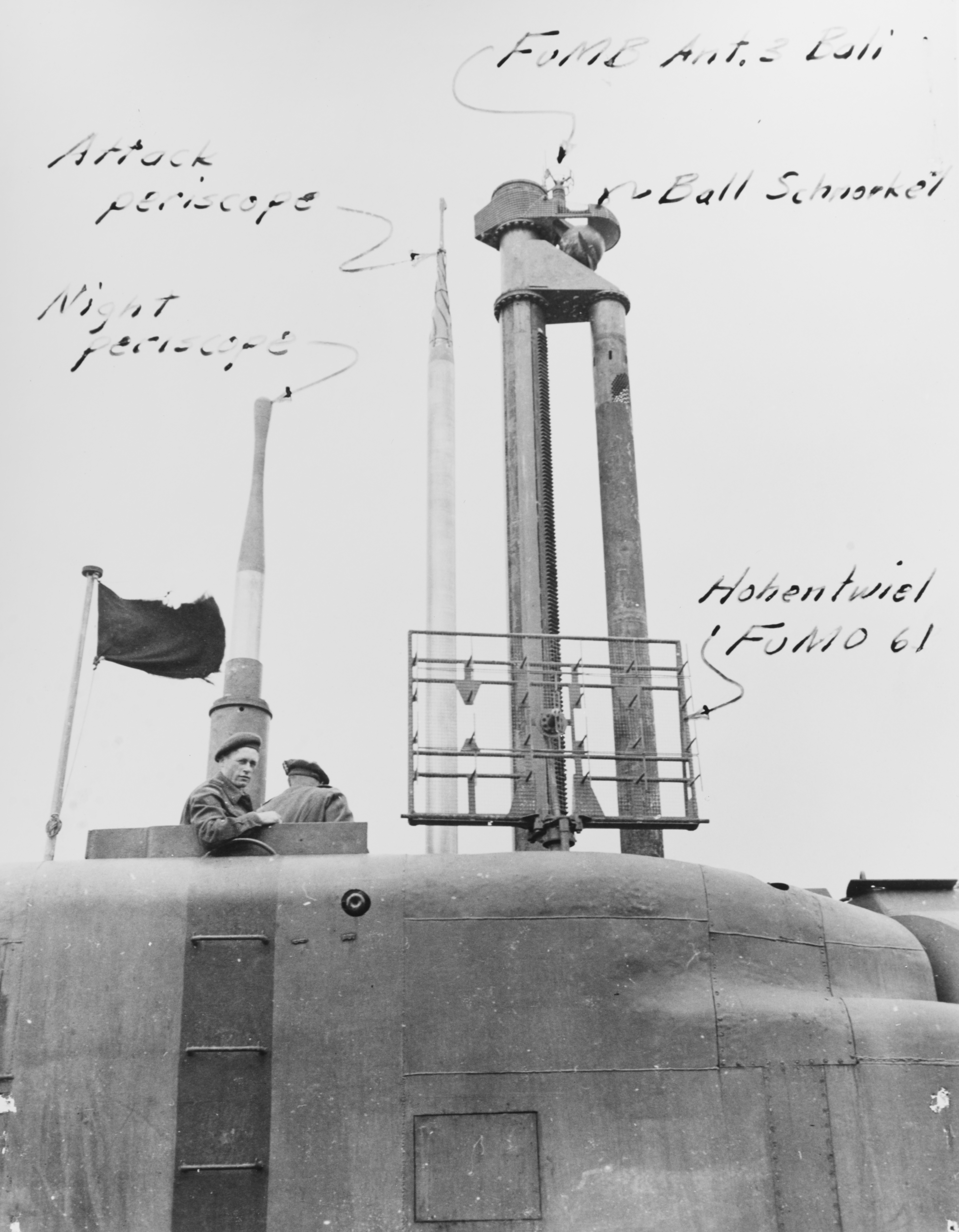
Submarine version FuMO 61 "Hohentwiel" antenna and FuMO Ant.3 "Bali" on board a Type XXI U-Boat

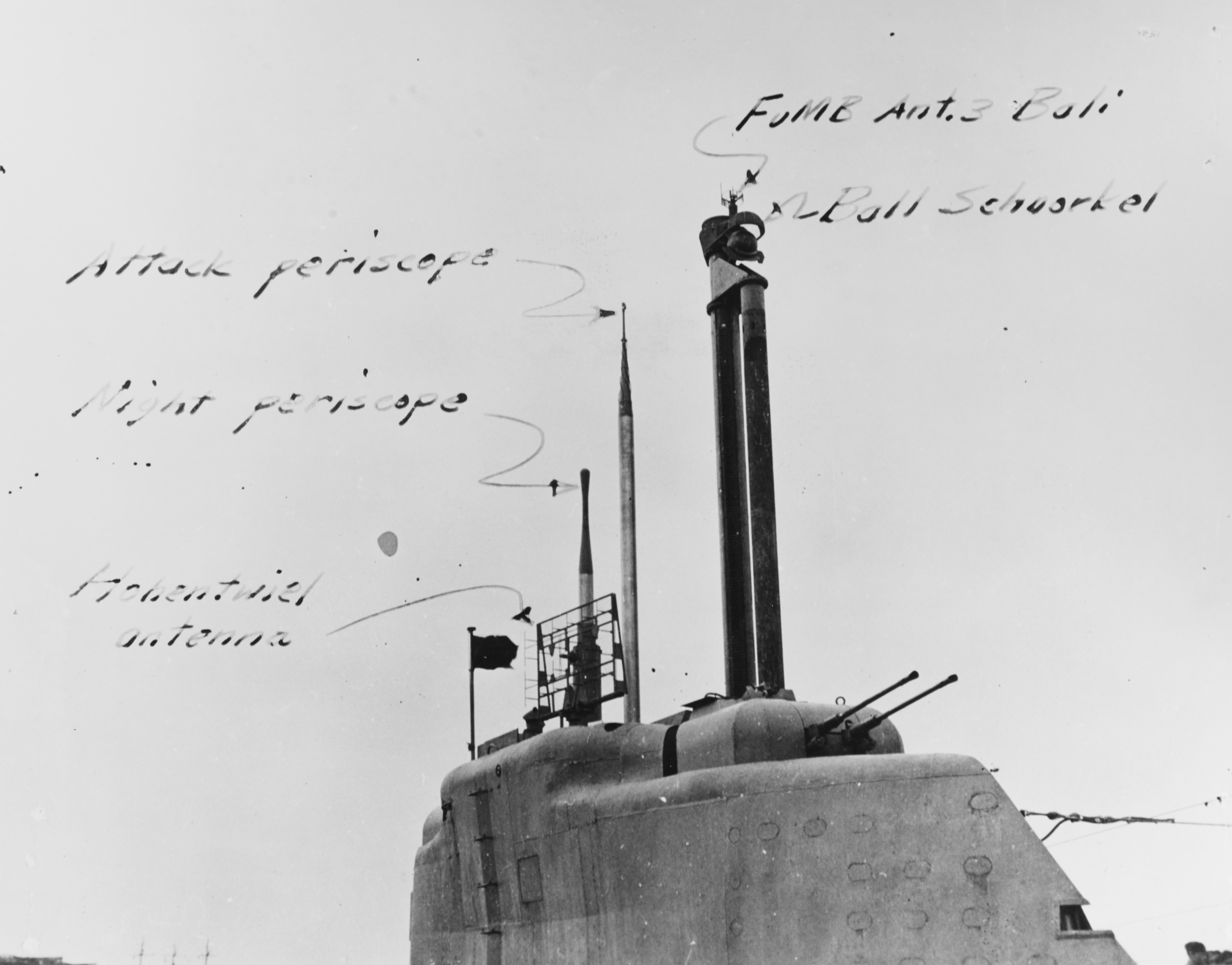
Same boat seen from further aft

== Literature ==
- G. Müller: Funkmessgeräte-Entwicklung bei C. Lorenz AG, 1935–1945. Internal archive volume of the SEL company, 2. expanded edition, December 1981
- RLM Werkschrift 4108, Bordfunkmessgerät FuG 200. Geheime Kommandosache, August 1943
- RLM Vorschrift Nr. 75/790, Prüffibel für Bordfunkmessgerät FuG 200. October 1944
- RLM Luftfahrtsröhren Ringbuch, Daten und Richtlinien über die Verwendung von Luftfahrtsröhren. January 1945
- K. Steimel: Bericht über den Zustand der Röhrentechnik in Deutschland zum Abschluss des Krieges. August 1945
- U.S. Air Materiel Command Dayton OH, Summary Report No. F-SU-1109-ND, The High Frequency War – A survey of German Electronic War. 10 May 1946
- CIOS Final Report 1746, German development of modulator valves for radar applications
- CIOS report XXX-36, Physikalisch-Technische Reichsanstalt. June 1945
- CIOS Report XXVII-46, Design of Radar Test Equipment at Siemens-Halske Munich
- BIOS Report 1228, HF Instruments & Measuring Techniques
- Achievement in Radio, Radio Science, Technology, Standards and Measurements at the National Bureau of Standards. US Department of Commerce, October 1986
- Gerhard Megla: Dezimeterwellentechnik. Fachbuchverlag Leipzig, 1952 (Chapter on measuring devices and measuring methods in the decimeter range of wavelengths)
- Radio Measurements, Proceedings of the IEEE, Volume 55, June 1967. Hewlett Packard, Microwave *Measurement Handbook, Chapter RF Peak Power Measurement, Procedures and Equipments
- Boonton Electronics Company, Application Note AN-50, Measuring the Peak Power
- U.S. Naval Research Laboratory, ASB Radar Alignment Procedure. November 1942
