= Elektroboot =

WW2 German submarine designed to operate entirely submerged

An Elektroboot ("electric boat" in German) was a submarine designed to operate entirely submerged, rather than as submersibles that could submerge as a temporary means to escape detection or launch an attack.

== History ==
Even before the Second World War the rocket designer Hellmuth Walter had been advocating the use of hydrogen peroxide (known as perhydrol) as a fuel. His engines were to become famous for their use in rocket-powered aircraft—notably the Me 163 Komet—but most of his early efforts were spent on systems for submarine propulsion.

In these cases the hydrogen peroxide was reduced chemically and the resulting gases used to spin a turbine at about 20,000 rpm, which was then geared to a propeller. This allowed the submarine to run underwater at all times, as there was no need for air to run the engines. The system also used up tremendous amounts of fuel, and any boat based on the design would either have to be huge or have limited range.

Thus the system saw only limited development even though a prototype was running in 1940. But when problems with the existing U-boat designs became evident in 1942, the work was stepped up. Eventually two engineers identified a solution to the problem.

Instead of running the submarine entirely on the perhydrol, they used it just for bursts of speed. Most of the operations would then be carried out as with a normal boat, using a diesel engine to charge batteries. However while a conventional design would use the diesel as the primary engine and the batteries for short periods of underwater power, in this case the boat would run almost all the time on batteries in a low-speed cruise, turning on the perhydrol during attacks. The diesel was now dedicated entirely to charging the batteries, which it needed only three hours to do.

The perhydrol design suffered from several design flaws which were not fixed before the end of the war. As an intermediate solution, the perhydrol propulsion system was dropped in favour of a conventional diesel/electric solution, but retaining the streamlined hull-shape. The battery capacity was increased significantly along with fuel stores, and the boat was designed to operate underwater for long periods.

== Electric U-boats ==
The result was the "Elektroboot" series, the Type XXI U-boat and a short range Type XXIII U-boat, finalized in January 1943 but with production only commencing in 1944–1945. When under water, the Type XXI managed to run at 17 knots (31 km/h; 20 mph), which was faster than a Type VII running full out on the surface and almost as fast as the ships attacking her. After the war, tests carried out by the United States Navy on two captured Type XXIs showed they could outrun some ASW ships by going in the direction of heavy seas. (The US Navy's first nuclear-powered submarine, USS Nautilus (SSN-571), used a modified Type XXI hull shape.) For most of the trip it ran silently underwater on batteries, surfacing only at night, and then only to snorkel depth. Weapons were likewise upgraded, with automated systems allowing the torpedo tubes to be reloaded in less than a quarter of the time, firing homing torpedoes that would attack on their own. Even the interior was improved: it was much larger and fitted with showers and a meat refrigerator for long patrols.

The design was to be produced in two versions, primarily the Type XXI, and lesser numbers of the smaller Type XXIII. Both were much larger and more difficult to build than the existing designs, the Type XXI taking some 18 months. Mass production of the new type did not really get started until 1944 and subsequently only one combat patrol was carried out by a Type XXI before the war ended. This patrol is considered controversial. According to some sources, the U-2511 did not make any contact with the enemy. Another version suggests that the U-boat did make contact with HMS Norfolk of the Royal Navy, but did not fire as the captain had already received orders of surrender. A number of boats were commissioned into Allied navies after the war for research purposes, and one into the Bundesmarine of post-war Germany.
