= Type 1945 destroyer =

World War II era German ship design

- A linedrawing of the Type 1945 Destroyer design.

Class overview
- Preceded by: Type 1936D destroyer & Type 1936E destroyer
- Succeeded by: None

General characteristics
- Type: Destroyer
- Displacement: 2,700 tonnes (2,700 long tons; 3,000 short tons) (Standard load); 3,100 tonnes (3,100 long tons; 3,400 short tons) (Full load); 3,700 tonnes (3,600 long tons; 4,100 short tons) (Deep load)
- Length: 120 metres (390 ft) (waterline); 125.5 metres (412 ft) (overall)
- Beam: 12 metres (39 ft)
- Draught: 3.88 metres (12.7 ft)
- Installed power: 80,000 shaft horsepower (60,000 kW); 4 x Wagner-Deschimag steam boilers
- Propulsion: 2 × three-bladed propellers; 2 x Wagner turbines
- Speed: 42.5 knots (78.7 km/h; 48.9 mph) (Standard load); 39.5 knots (73.2 km/h; 45.5 mph) (Full load); 37 knots (69 km/h; 43 mph) (Deep load)
- Range: 3,600 nautical miles (6,700 km; 4,100 mi) (at 19 knots (35 km/h; 22 mph))
- Boats & landing craft carried: 2 × Motor pinnances; 1 × Torpedo cutter; 1 × Motor dinghy
- Complement: 350
- Armament: 8 × 12.8 cm (5.0 in) L/45 C/41 guns (1,440 rounds); 4 × 5.5 cm (2.2 in) L/76,5 Anti-Aircraft guns (5,000 rounds); 12 × 3 cm (1.2 in) L/66,6 M-44 Anti-Aircraft guns (24,000 rounds); 8 × 53.3 cm (21.0 in) torpedo tubes (16 torpedoes); 100 × mines

The Type 1945 destroyers were a planned class of destroyers, for the Kriegsmarine, whose design was based upon that of the Type 1936D and E destroyers. Their plan involved a return to steam boilers, which had been replaced by diesel engines in all ships designs after the Type 1942 destroyers. No ships were ever built, as the end of the war was rapidly approaching.

== Development ==
The Type 1945 destroyer was designed in 1945, based upon the design of the Type 1936D and E destroyers, the plans for which were later accidentally destroyed by fire. They were designed during a time when Germany was prioritizing construction of submarines, with little to no effort going into her surface fleet, making the odds of the Type 1945 destroyers, or any other type of ship which was designed after 1942, being constructed, near zero. However, the Konstruktionsamt (Construction Department) continued to create designs for surface ships until the end of the war.

Before the design was even created, Germany was restricting the use of her surface fleet; after the sinking of the German battleship Bismarck on 27 May 1941, heavy restrictions were placed upon surface ship commanders' tactical freedom. Around the time the design was created, after the sinking of the German battleship Tirpitz on 12 November 1944, most of Germany's surface ships were being pulled back entirely, to serve only in the Baltic Sea. From the spring of 1945 to near the end of the war, the Kriegsmarine was almost entirely focused upon resupplying and supporting garrisons along the Baltic Coast. Later on, in May, the Kriegsmarine embarked upon the task of evacuating hundreds of thousands of civilians and soldiers from the east, ahead of the Soviet forces which were rapidly pushing westward.

The Type 1945 destroyers were designed to be able to defend against submarines, light naval forces, and aircraft, particularly torpedo bombers. Their design differed greatly from previous ones in that it utilized steam turbines, rather than diesel engines. Overall, their design gave them 12% higher engine performance despite having lighter machinery, and a more powerful main armament with a shorter hull. The project never made it past the drawing board, and no ship of the class was ever ordered or laid down.

== Characteristics ==
The ships of the Type 1945 destroyer class were to be 120 metres (390 ft) long at the waterline and 125.5 metres (412 ft) long o/a, have a beam of 12 metres (39 ft), a draught of 3.88 metres (12.7 ft), and displace 2,700 tonnes (2,700 long tons; 3,000 short tons) at standard load, 3,100 tonnes (3,100 long tons; 3,400 short tons) at full load, and 3,700 tonnes (3,600 long tons; 4,100 short tons) at deep load. They were to have a complement of 350, and carry two motor pinnaces, one torpedo cutter and a motor dinghy.

They were to be armed with eight 12.7 cm (5.0 in) SK C/41 guns, (Note: SK – Schnelladekanone (quick loading cannon); C – Construktionsjahr (year of guns design).) placed in four twin turrets, with 1,440 rounds of ammunition, four 5.5 cm (2.2 in) L/76.5 guns, (Note: L – Länge in Kaliber (length in caliber).) with 5,000 rounds of ammunition, twelve 3 cm (1.2 in) L/66.6 M-44 guns, with 24,000 rounds of ammunition, eight total 53.3 cm (21.0 in) torpedo tubes, placed in quadruple tubes on her deck, with 16 torpedoes, and 100 mines. They were to have high-angle (anti-aircraft) director ship gun fire-control systems, placed on their fore and aft, which were to be fitted with radio direction finders.

They were to be propelled by two three-bladed propellers, two sets of Wagner turbines, four Wagner-Deschimag boilers feeding high-pressure superheated steam (at 70 atm (1,029 psi; 7,093 kPa) and 400 °C (752 °F)), intended to give her 80,000 shaft horsepower (60,000 kW), and a speed of 42.5 knots (78.7 km/h; 48.9 mph), 39.5 knots (73.2 km/h; 45.5 mph), or 37 knots (69 km/h; 43 mph), depending on if they were at standard load, full load, or deep load, respectively. They were to carry 800 tonnes (790 long tons; 880 short tons) of oil, to give her a range of 3,600 nautical miles (6,700 km; 4,100 mi) at 19 knots (35 km/h; 22 mph). The machinery was calculated to have a weight-power ratio of 12 kg/shp (35 lb/kW). (Note: kg/shp is a weight-to-power ratio, showing that the propulsion system weighed 12 kg (kilograms) for every unit of shp (shaft horsepower) that it generated.)
