= Mareșal (tank destroyer) =

Romanian tank destroyer

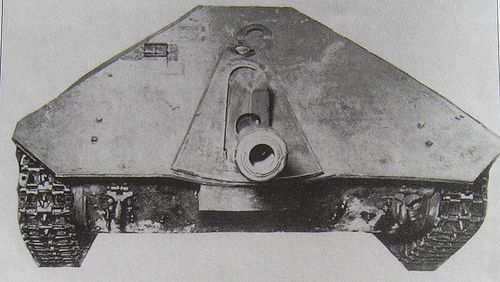
- Front view of the M-00 prototype
- Type: Tank destroyer
- Place of origin: Kingdom of Romania

Service history
- In service: May–October 1944 (Note: Only saw service for crew training within the 2nd Armored Regiment's "M" Battalion)
- Used by: Kingdom of Romania
- Wars: World War II

Production history
- Designer: See Development
- Designed: 1942–44
- Manufacturer: Rogifer (Note: Some components were produced by other Romanian factories, as well as factories from the allied Germany and a number of other countries (see text). However, Rogifer was the main producer and the factory where assembly took place.) (formerly Malaxa, now FAUR)
- Produced: 1943–44
- No. built: 7 prototypes (Note: M-00 is generally considered the first prototype, with M-06 being last, bringing the total number to seven. However, some earlier experimental models existed before M-00.); early serial production
- Variants: See Variants

Specifications (M-05 prototype (Note: The table shows M-05's specifications, since said vehicle was—along with M-06, which was almost identical, but is less documented—one of the two main prototypes, on which the serial production vehicles were based.))
- Mass: 8.5 tonnes (8.4 long tons; 9.4 short tons)
- Length: 4.43 m (14 ft 6 in) (c. 5.8 m with gun included)
- Width: 2.44 m (8 ft 0 in)
- Height: 1.53 m (5 ft 0 in)
- Crew: 2 (3 for later versions)
- Armor: 20 mm (front), 10 mm (sides/rear), 4 mm (top and bottom plates)
- Main armament: 1 x 75 mm Reșița M1943 (50 rounds) (Note: Most earlier prototypes had used a 122 mm howitzer. Various other guns were also considered for use, including other howitzers or anti-tank guns.)
- Secondary armament: 2 x 9 mm submachine guns shot through firing ports
- Engine: Hotchkiss H-39; 120 hp (89 kW)
- Power/weight: 14 hp/t
- Suspension: Leaf spring
- Fuel capacity: ~215 litres (57 US gal)
- Operational range: ~200 km on road, 100 km off-road
- Maximum speed: On road: 50 km/h (31 mph); Off road: 35 km/h (22 mph)

The Mareșal (meaning "marshal"), also known as the M-tank, was a Romanian-produced light tank destroyer from World War II. Romania was a member of the Axis powers and created the vehicle in response to the Soviet T-34 and KV-1 tanks. It is credited with having inspired the German Hetzer's design, according to multiple German military staff.

A total of 1,000 vehicles were planned for production, which was to make the Mareșal the backbone of the Romanian armored forces, making it the country's most numerous armored fighting vehicle by far. Thus, apart from the main tank destroyer variant, other versions were also planned. These included a 122 or 150 mm self-propelled howitzer version, an anti-aircraft vehicle and a command vehicle armed with machine guns and a flamethrower (see Variants section). A rocket launcher and a flamethrower version were also tested in the early development phase, before the M-00 prototype. Germany planned to also buy the vehicle and make its own Flakpanzer version.

Due to the ongoing events, however, the goal was not reached. Seven prototypes were built. Additionally, the development of around 100 series production vehicles had begun, of which a first series of 10 tank destroyers was near-completed. The Mareșal never came to see action because its development and production were heavily slowed down by Anglo-American bombings and finally put to an end by the invading Red Army.

Had the Mareșal been deployed into combat, it would have had big potential to become an effective tank destroyer, according to Waffenamt and OKH delegates who attended its trials. During tests, it proved to be superior in many aspects to the German StuG III G that it competed against, which itself was very successful and highly appreciated by its crews. The Mareșal's qualities included its strong firepower, accurate gun, good mobility and very low silhouette (around 1.5 m), the latter of which would have made the vehicle a difficult-to-hit target for enemies. However, the vehicle also had drawbacks, mainly a cramped interior, poor sights and thin armor.

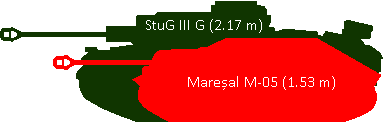
The Mareșal's very low profile meant the vehicle was a target difficult to hit for enemies, while also being easy to camouflage

== Name ==
Mareșal is Romanian for "marshal", the highest military rank in many countries. The vehicle was named after Marshal Ion Antonescu, Romania's wartime leader (Conducător). It was also referred to by a number of other names, such as Carul M or, more modernly, Tancul M, both meaning "M-tank". The word car (definite form carul) is inherited in Romanian from Latin carrus and mostly means "cart"/"chariot", but in this context, it is an outdated word for "tank" (now replaced by tanc), based on French char (also compare Italian and Spanish carro). Sometimes, the vehicle is referred to in Romanian as Vânătorul de care Mareșal (Note: Romanian pronunciation: [vɨnə'torul de 'kare mare'ʃal]) ("Mareșal tank hunter"), or less commonly Vânătorul de care M ("Tank hunter 'M'").

In some documents, names like Piesa M ("M-piece"), Arma M ("M-weapon") and Arma Mareșal ("Mareșal weapon") were used. One report referred to the vehicle as "A-43".

German historian Walter Spielberger refers to the vehicle as Marschall (German for "marshal") in his literature.

== Background ==
Romania had entered the war with R-1, R-2 and R35 tanks acquired during the interwar period. While initially successful, these became obsolete with the introduction of Soviet T-34 and KV-1 tanks by late 1941. The weakness of the Romanian tank force was already obvious by then, but became even more acute after the Axis defeat at the Battle of Stalingrad. By the end of 1942, the only modern vehicles Romania had been able to acquire were small numbers of German Panzer IIIs and Panzer IVs. A firing test showed that the T-34 was invulnerable to the R-2's 37 mm gun at any angle, which led to said Romanian tank being given the new role of exclusively fighting unarmored Soviet positions. Horse-drawn 37 mm Pak anti-tank guns used by the Romanians were nicknamed the "door-knocker" by Soviet T-34 drivers due to their inability to penetrate the tank's armor.

Different solutions for modernizing the Romanian armored forces were sought after. One was getting more tanks from the allied Germany. Another method used was modernizing Romanian and captured Soviet tanks by turning them into tank destroyers; this program gave birth to conversions like the TACAM T-60, TACAM R-2 and VDC R35, which were more effective against Soviet armor.

Romania also looked to produce its own original armored vehicle that was capable of effectively tackling Soviet ones. Producing a Romanian medium tank was considered, but not implemented. Instead, the Romanians decided in late 1942 to produce a tank destroyer, since it was more suited to their country's industry. This vehicle's characteristics were decided in January 1943: they included small dimensions, strong firepower, well-sloped armor and a maximum speed "higher than that of tanks". The resulting vehicle was to become the Mareșal.

== Development ==
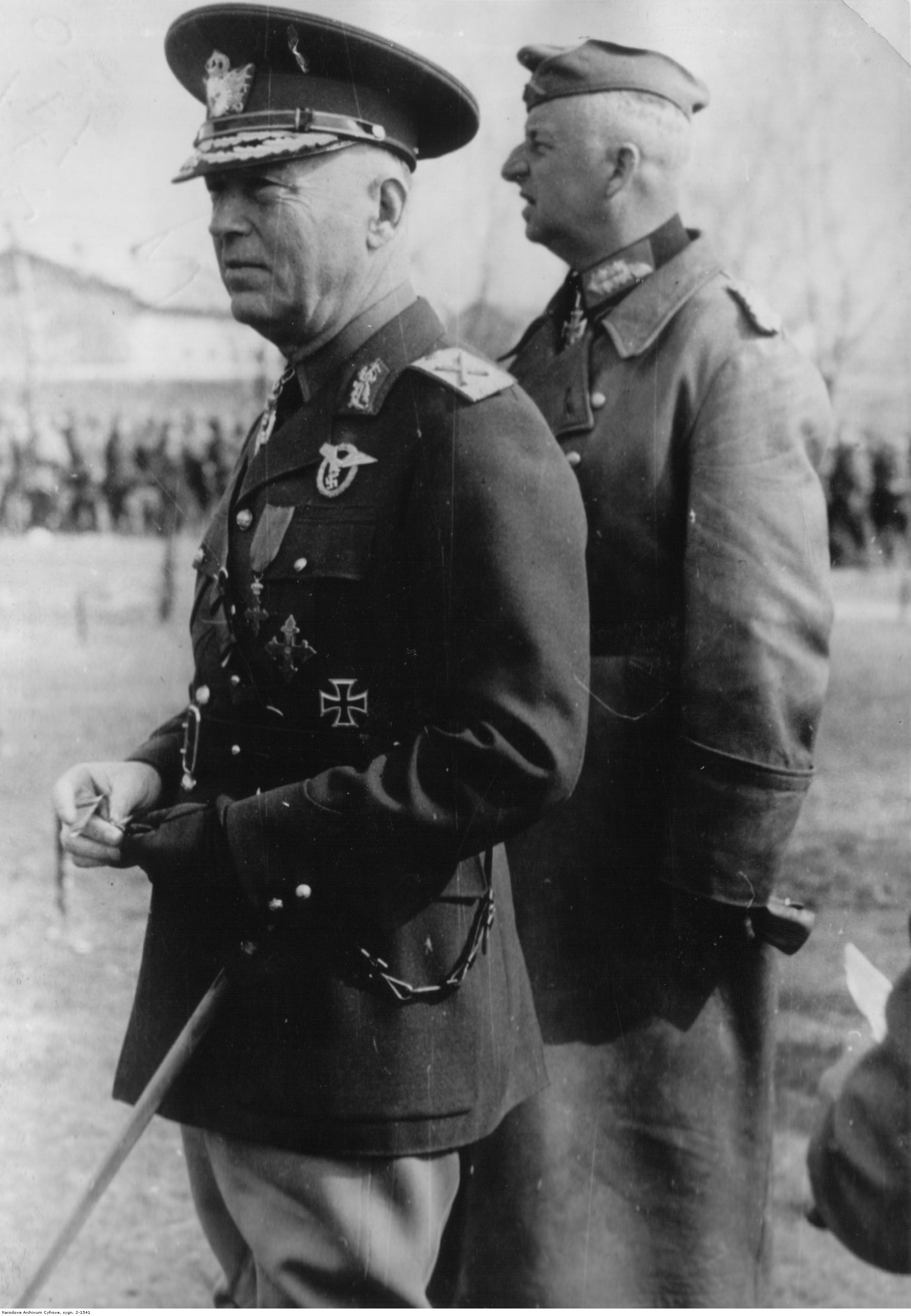
Marshal Ion Antonescu (left), namesake for the vehicle, with German field marshal Erich von Manstein

On February 6, 1943 a workshop was founded at the Rogifer Works (formerly Malaxa Works, currently FAUR) with the purpose of experimenting with the creation of a tank destroyer. The Romanians had no experience with designing an armored vehicle from scratch, since by that point, every Romanian-designed vehicle was a license-built modification of a foreign design (R-1 and Malaxa UE) or a conversion based on a foreign chassis (TACAMs). Due to this lack of experience, they had decided to forgo theoretical preliminary plans and mate an artillery piece with an existing tank chassis, studying practical problems, which would eventually lead to a truly local design through continuous testing and modification.

Multiple first experimental models were created in early 1943. One saw a mortar mounted on a T-60 light tank chassis. The mortar was equipped with rocket-assisted rounds. Trials were deemed unsatisfactory due to the chassis not being robust enough and the armament having poor accuracy. In parallel, another model armed with a Katyusha rocket launcher was built for artillery purposes and tested in June and July, but this project was not continued either. A flamethrower version is also known to have existed.

As a result, a new model was built by a team consisting of engineers Captain Gheorghe Sâmbotin and Major Nicolae Anghel, who were tasked with designing a new vehicle appropriate for service on the Eastern Front. They chose the unexpected yet successful solution of adapting a light tank to fire a heavy gun. The chosen chassis was again that of the T-60, but was this time enlarged, while the new gun choice was a Soviet 122 mm M-30 howitzer, of which plenty had been captured by the Romanian Army. Other howitzers of smaller calibers (100–105 mm) were also considered. In order to be effective against enemy armor, a shaped charge round was developed for the howitzer. The T-60 turret and upper works were removed and replaced by tortoise shell-shaped armor plates that were 20–30 mm thick and angled at 45°. The resulting vehicle had an unusually low profile of around 1.5 m (which was advantageous, since it didn't only make the vehicle difficult to hit, but also made it easy to camouflage) and a crew of only two members. Secondary armament was locally produced version of the Czechoslovak ZB-30 light machine gun. Engineers Constantin Ghiulai Constantin Ghiulai (designer of the TACAM T-60 and TACAM R-2) and Radu Vereș (director of Rogifer) were also involved in the project.

Named "Mareșal", this new prototype was designated M-00 and presented to Marshal Ion Antonescu on July 2, 1943. Despite earlier models having existed, M-00 is generally considered the first prototype since it was the first one to have the general shape of the Mareșal. It began testing at the Sudiți firing range outside of Slobozia on July 30, 1943. Fears that the tank would be toppled by the considerable recoil of the howitzer proved unfounded; however, other problems were noted, mostly involving the gun mounting. Testing was considered successful and a committee to supervise the Mareșal project was created by orders of Ion Antonescu's cabinet.

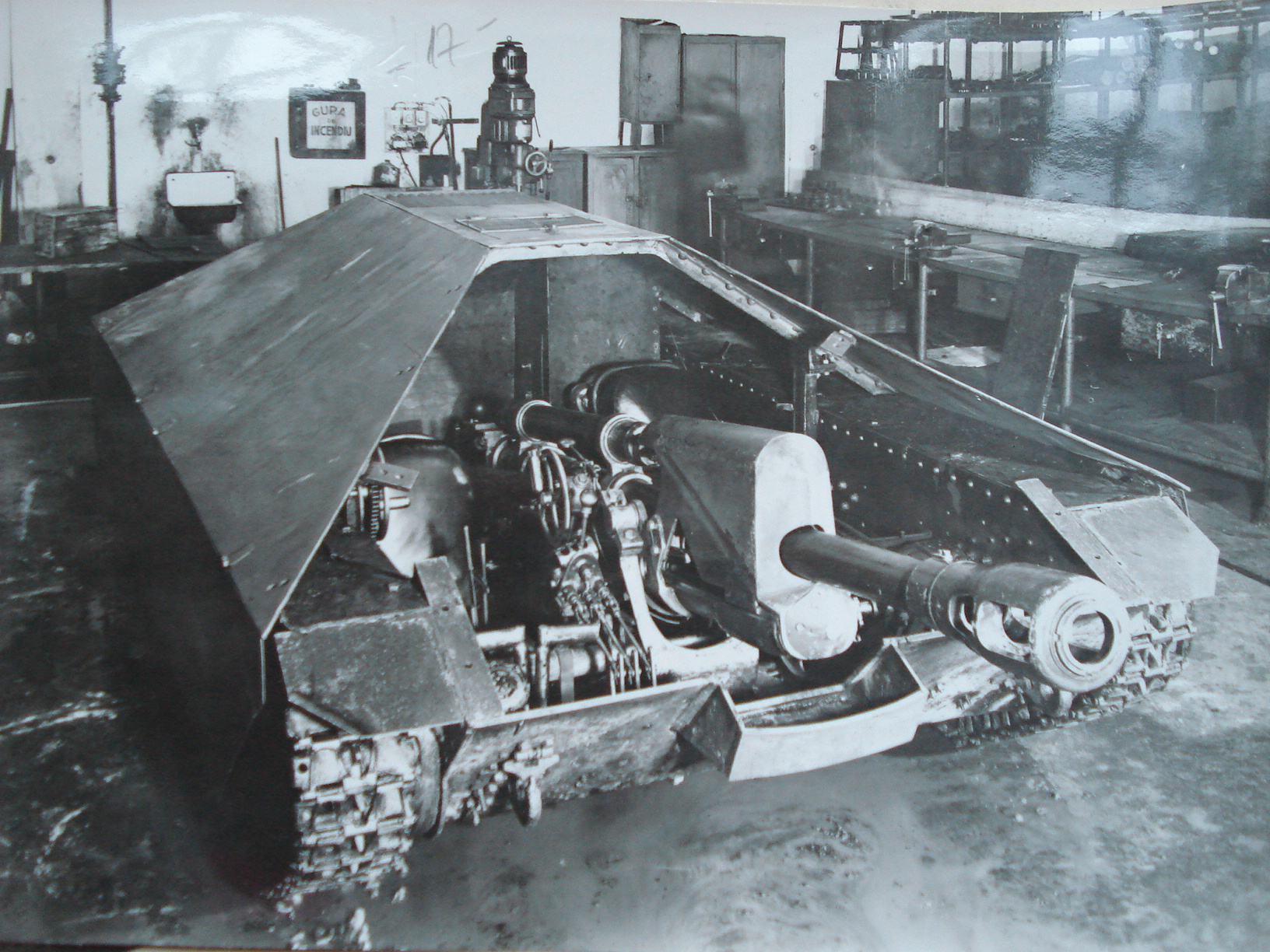
M-00 prototype under construction. From this angle its low profile is obvious

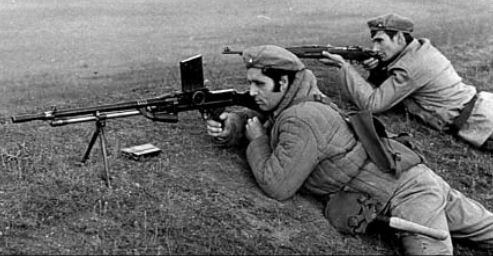
A ZB-30 light machine gun (left) was used as M-00's secondary armament

Afterwards, a workshop within the Rogifer Works was made available for the construction of three more prototypes: M-01, M-02, and M-03. They were all enlarged and reinforced, with the latter being 43.2 cm wider and 13.4 cm longer than the T-60 tank. These were completed by mid-October 1943 and were progressively modified to fix problems shown by M-00. M-01 was the last one to use the T-60 chassis; later prototypes used Rogifer-built ones. Construction methods were modified to use welding rather than riveting and the interior compartment was divided using a bulkhead. The prototypes had a crew of two, positioned in the front compartment: a driver-aimer-gunner on the right and a commander-loader-radio operator on the left. The former was situated more frontally, which is also shown in photographs.

M-01, M-02, and M-03 were tested at Sudiți in front of Marshal Antonescu on October 23, 1943, the same day as the 75 mm Resița M1943 anti-tank gun. Due to the exceptional performance of the Romanian anti-tank gun, Lieutenant-Colonel Paul Drăghiescu suggested that it should be mounted on future prototypes of the Mareșal. This change would be incorporated into all further prototypes and the serial production vehicles. Lieutenant-Colonel Valerian Nestorescu gives a more detailed description of the test, stating that the 75 mm Resița gun managed to hit and penetrate eight 100 mm steel plates from distances of 300 m to 1 km. British author Mark Axworthy writes that the 75 mm Reșița M1943 was arguably the most versatile gun of its class during World War II, outperforming its Western, German and Soviet equivalents. Lieutenant-Colonel Drăghiescu had also proposed two other Mareșal versions at that point: one with a 122 or 150 mm howitzer and one with a 20–37 mm anti-aircraft gun. The former variant is known to have had plans that were later shown to the Germans.

The next prototype, M-04, incorporated significant changes and was completed in January 1944. Its plans were presented to Adolf Hitler in the early days of that month. The prototype was powered by a 120 hp Hotchkiss engine, the same used on the French H-39 light tank, and mounted the new 75 mm Resița M1943 anti-tank gun instead of the 122 mm howitzer. In February, M-04 was sent to Sudiți for evaluation. Again, concerns were brought up about the vehicle's ability to withstand the gun's recoil. Testing, however, showed the main gun could be safely fired. Two German representatives observed the testing of M-04 and were impressed by its maneuverability and novel design. Lieutenant-Colonel Haymann, an OKH delegate who attended M-04's testing, stated that the Mareșal is going to be effective against the Soviet army, calling it ein großer Hetzer ("a big troublemaker").

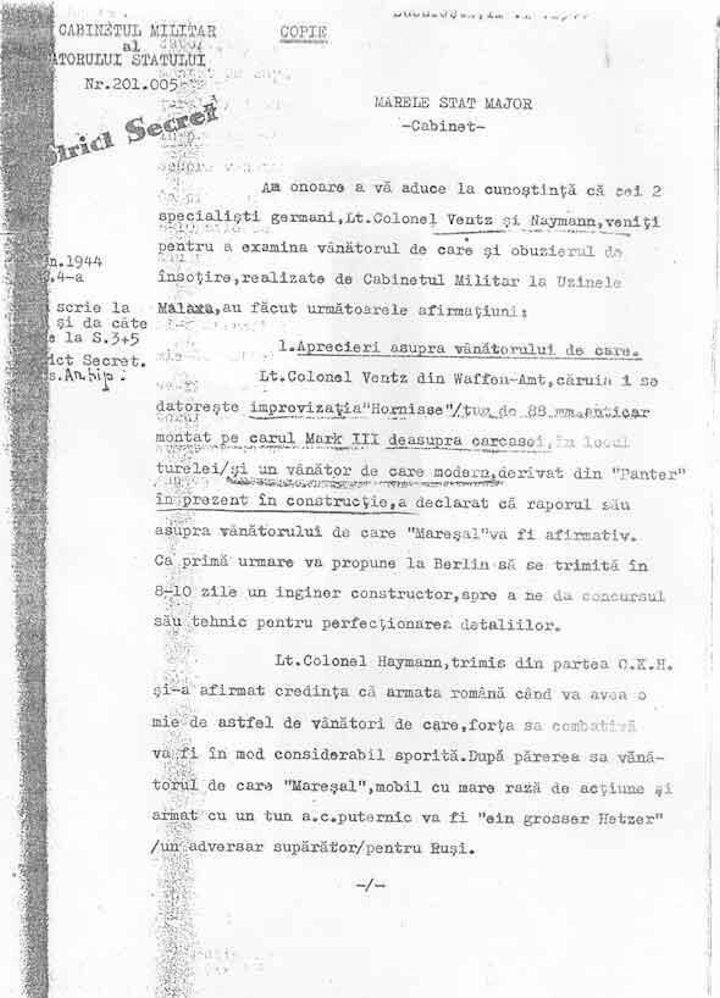
1944 report in which German officials state the Mareșal was going to be "a big troublemaker [ein großer Hetzer] for the Soviets"

The vehicle's development was slowed down by the Anglo-American bombing, which had started in April 1944. İt had begun disrupting the production of the first series of vehicles, "Series 0", which — while originally expected in June — was rescheduled for autumn 1944 and then January 1945. As a result, parts of the Rogifer Works were moved from Bucharest to the area of Sibiu in Transylvania, where production was to take place. In July, Rogifer was bombarded again. During the bombardment, a guard soldier by the name of Turcescu-Cristea had left the bomb shelter and went into the targeted Mareșal's workshop, managing to put out the fire and save the production tools and archive room from total destruction, while getting hurt in the process.

The final series of prototypes, M-05 and M-06, were built in March 1944. They were the two "main prototypes", on which the serial production vehicles were based. While the M-04 had still used the T-60's suspension, these last two prototypes had entirely given up on the Soviet light tank's components. They were largely Romanian-built, with part of the components being of German origin. M-05 was completed in May and tested that same month. It impressed the attending German officials by outperforming a StuG III G that it competed against. The later testing stages involving M-05 occurred in August and September 1944, in the immediate aftermath of King Michael's Coup, which overthrew the pro-Axis Antonescu and put Romania on the Allied side.

On 31 August 1944, it was decided to complete the first batch of serial production vehicles ("Series 0", whose development had begun during spring), but to suspend production of the later series. The Soviet Armistice Commission imposed a secret additional protocol on the original armistice on 26 October, through which the Mechanized Troops Command (Comandamentul Trupelor Motomecanizate) was disbanded, bringing the Mareșal project to an end, just as "Series 0" was nearing completion.

After this point, the Mareșal is not known to have seen action or any kind of service. What happened to the vehicles is unknown, but it is possible that the Soviets had either confiscated or destroyed all completed examples of the Mareșal, according to Mark Axworthy. Trials had shown the Mareșal to be a promising vehicle that was to have a successful service life, with the Germans being the ones who praised it the most. However, there were also critics, especially among high-ranking Romanian officials, who stated that the "exaggerated angling" of the armor plates and the resulting cramped interior decreased combat effectiveness by affecting the crew members' sight on the battlefield. Historians Charles Kliment and Vladimír Francev describe the tank destroyer as having been advanced for its time.

The only known mention of the vehicle after this point is a report from 1 November 1944, which stated that the "M-project" — as the Mareșal was referred to — was not to fall out of interest, since its production was not out of question even after the end of the war.

See Variants section below for a more detailed view regarding each Mareșal variant's history and characteristics.

=== German officials involved ===
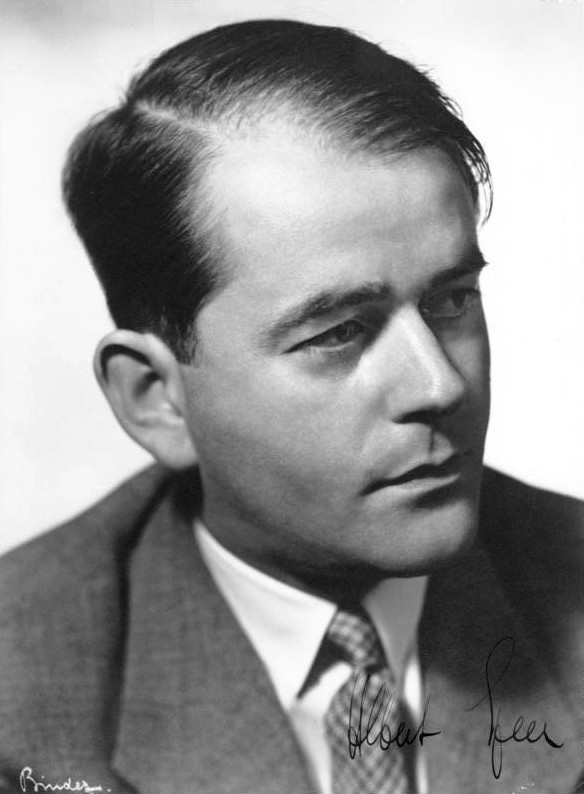
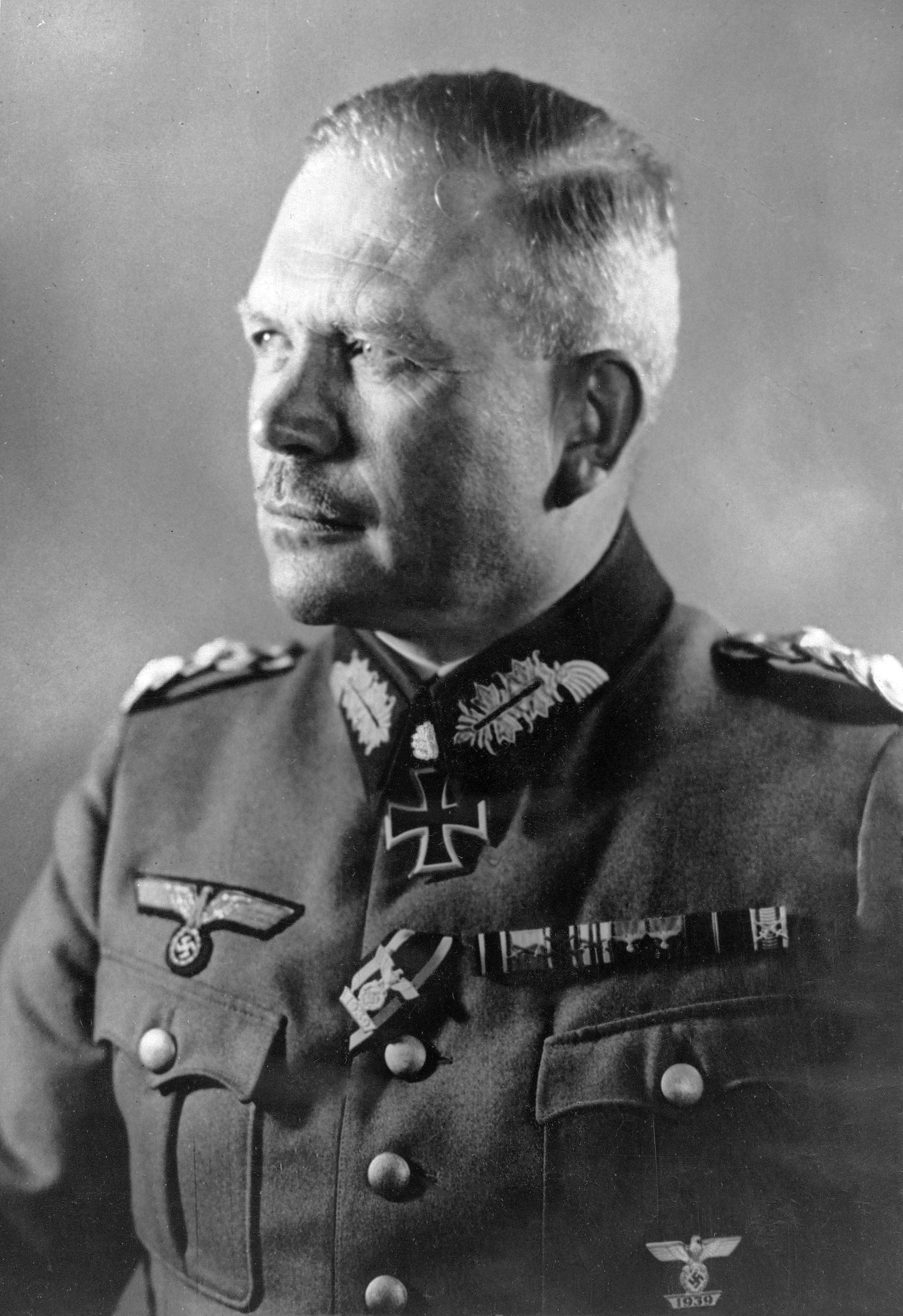
Albert Speer (left) and Heinz Guderian were both involved in the development of the Mareșal

Mark Axworthy notes how Hitler "was enthusiastic" about the Mareșal and agreed supporting its development, despite Germany having problems with its own armored fighting vehicle production. One reason behind the support, however, was that mass-producing an indigenous Romanian tank destroyer would have stopped Romania's need to be supplied with German tanks, which the Germans themselves possessed in limited numbers. The Mareșal was cheap to produce; one Panzer IV required as much armor plate as seven Mareșals. The supply of German material to Romania for Mareșal production would have disrupted Germany's own production of 70 Panzer IVs and around the same number of Sd.Kfz. 251 half-tracks. However, it would have allowed the creation of almost 490 Mareșals, which the Germans believed was more important, thus agreeing on supplying materials.

General Heinz Guderian, Inspector General of the German Armored Troops, is known to have been implicated in the tank destroyer's development. He was shown the M-04 plans and believed the "M-tank" to be a vehicle "capable of weakening enemy armored attacks". One particular detail of the Mareșal that impressed the German officials was its pedal-steering system, according to Colonel Radu Davidescu. By steering the vehicle using the feet, the driver was also able to control the gun. This allowed the crew to be reduced to two members. Lieutenant-Colonel Ventz of the Waffenamt stated that the Germans had also tried reducing their armored fighting vehicles' crews, but were unsuccessful in finding solutions for doing so.

Reichsminister Albert Speer and General Walther Buhle are known to have also been involved in the Mareșal's development.

Romanian author Cornel Scafeș writes that relations between German officials and their Romanian counterparts were not always the best, with the former accusing the latter of too slowly developing and experimenting with the vehicle.

== Serial production ==
Following the October 1943 testing of M-01, M-02 and M-03, Major Anghel and the director of the Rogifer Works were sent to tour several German factories to get information on the latest aspects of tank development. They concluded that the Mareșal's design solution was correct. Preparations for mass production began in November 1943. To this end, a commission was sent to France to order 1000 Hotchkiss engines, and a Romanian technician was sent to Germany to coordinate the importation of other components.

In February 1944, Romania managed to secure contracts with suppliers in France, Sweden and Switzerland for tank parts. The Germans also offered to assist Romania by sending specialists to the Rogifer Works and supplying necessary components, including gun optics, armored plates, and radio sets. It was planned to gradually assimilate licenses for all imported items, so Romania could carry on the production process on its own.

The first "Series 0" of 10 vehicles was near-completed. Due to the bombing of Romania, its completion date kept on being pushed away from the original June 1944 all the way to January 1945. Additionally, 90 further vehicles ("Series 1" and "2") were in their very early phase of production, themselves rescheduled for the later months of 1945. "Series 0" was also referred to by its German name, Null-Serie.

Production rate was intended to reach four per day, with monthly production later rising to 100 vehicles. Apart from stopping Romania's need of having to get supplied with German tanks, another reason why Hitler had agreed with helping the program was a psychological oneː the vehicle's name. According to Mark Axworthy, Ion Antonescu had become one of Hitler's most respected allies during the course of the war. This fact had led to Hitler wanting to assist the Mareșal's development, since the vehicle was named after the Romanian leader, writes Walter Spielberger.

=== Planned mixed Hetzer-Mareșal production ===
As the Mareșal had met with approval from German specialists and effective support from Hitler for its serial production, a preliminary convention was signed on 8 June 1944 between the Romanian Ministry of Defence and the German OKH for cooperation in expediting mass production. By the time the convention was finalized, the Germans were interested in ordering several dozen Mareșal chassis to mount 37 mm Rheinmetall anti-aircraft guns, and not only offered Romania full license manufacture of the Hetzer's 160 hp Praga engine for the Mareșal (the Western Allies had overrun the Hotchkiss plant), but also, because the two vehicles would then have a high commonality of parts (engine, radio, tracks and sights), offered a license for the entire vehicle.

Preliminary talks on the proposed joint Hetzer/Mareșal production established that the Germans would supply an uprated 220 hp diesel engine, the armor, the tracks and part of the sights, while the Romanians would build the same parts they were already producing for the Mareșal: the chassis, suspension, wheels, controls, part of the sights and the 75 mm Reșița M1943 gun. Deliveries were to be divided equally between Romania and Germany. To familiarize the Romanians with the Hetzer, Hitler decided to give them 53, with a delivery date of 25 August. However, both this delivery and the entire project were halted by King Michael's Coup.

== Influence on Hetzer ==
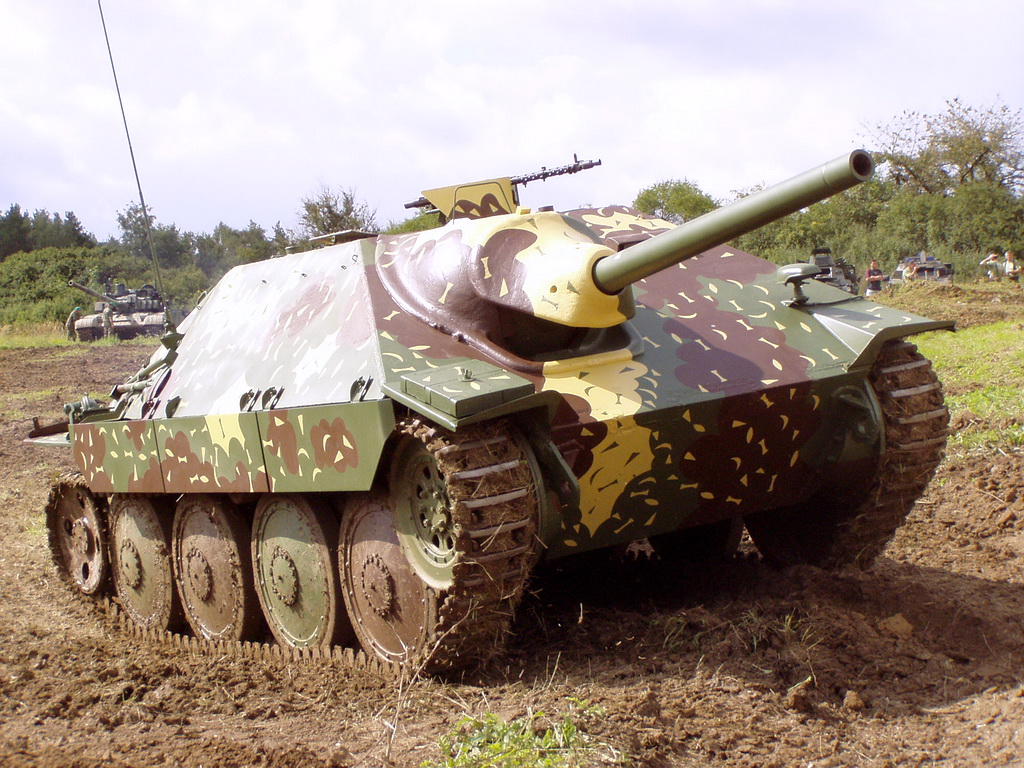
The German Hetzer was influenced by the Mareșal. Romania obtained the license to produce the Hetzer itself.

The Mareșal is credited for having inspired the design of the German Hetzer tank destroyer. While in Germany, the Romanian commission responsible for the Mareșal had learned that the Germans were also studying the possibility of mounting a strong anti-tank gun on the Panzer 38(t) light tank chassis. Discussions had led to the conclusion that the Romanians' design solution for the Mareșal was correct and that they were more advanced than the Germans in developing their light tank destroyer. This wouldn't last for long, however, since the Reich's industry had a much greater capacity, which led to the Hetzer entering production in April 1944 and seeing action later that same year, while the Mareșal was still in its early production phase.

Mark Axworthy and Cornel Scafeș write that the Hetzer and Mareșal were very similar in their armament and general shape. According to their works, as well as contemporary documents, it was German Lieutenant-Colonel Ventz, who acknowledged in May 1944 that the Hetzer had followed the Mareșal's design. Another German official, engineer Wohlrath of Alkett, also stated this. He told the Romanians how the Germans had been searching for solutions to design a light vehicle armed with a strong gun for two years, and continued by saying "we didn't find it, but you did". According to American historian Steven Zaloga, "The Germans were impressed with the overall layout of the Mareșal, and it is credited with being the inspiration for the German Jagdpanzer 38(t) tank destroyer".

Hilary Doyle and Walter Spielberger do not directly mention a connection between the two vehicles, but write how in December 1943—the time the Hetzer was being designed—Hitler is known to have already been aware of the Mareșal, which he "extraordinarily liked".

== Service ==
On 10 May 1944, the Mechanized Troops Command took over responsibility for the project and subsequently created the "M" Battalion within the 2nd Armored Regiment. The purpose of this battalion was to train would-be Mareșal crews and test new models of the vehicle. The M-05 prototype was tested preliminary at the end of May, then tested continuously from 24 July to 21 August. However, there are no mentions about tests of the previous prototypes. Indeed, the "M" Battalion would have little reason to further test previous prototypes, or train would-be crews by using them. This was due to several reasons. For one, M-05 was too technologically different compared to the previous 5 prototypes. M-05 was largely Romanian-built, while its predecessors used many components from the Soviet T-60 light tank. Furthermore, the armament of all but one of the previous prototypes was entirely different: a 122 mm howitzer instead of a 75 mm anti-tank gun. Finally, the first 200 Mareșals which were going to be built were set to follow the design of M-05. It is for these reasons that the only reports of Mareșal usage after the creation of the "M" Battalion in May 1944 refer solely to M-05, as the previous prototypes were most likely unfit for training crews which were expected to operate in the near future solely on M-05 and M-06 copies. Testing of M-05 continued until the project was terminated by the Soviets on 26 October.

The planned 1000 vehicles were to form 32 anti-tank battalions consisting of 30 Mareșals each. The first 12, however, were planned to be sent to a mixed tank battalion, the "E" Battalion, along with 15 Panzer 38(t)s (called T-38 in the Romanian army). Squads of four vehicles were planned, made up of three tank destroyers and one command vehicle variant.

== Variants ==
=== Tank destroyer (main variant) ===
==== Prototypes ====
The Mareșal went through a number of prototypes. Each of them was to fix problems shown by the previous prototype, gradually improving the Mareșal until it was to become a vehicle worthy of serial production and capable of effectively confronting Soviet armor.

First experimental models

The first models were built in the first half of 1943. According to one source, one of them used a mortar shooting rocket-assisted rounds on an unmodified T-60 tank chassis. The conclusion taken after trials was that neither the armament nor the chassis (in its unmodified state) were adequate for the tank destroyer role. The second model, created for the artillery role, used a Katyusha rocket launcher and was tested on 16 and 26 June and 22 July 1943, being discontinued as well.

Another source mentions how, in February 1943, studies began for developing an armored tank destroyer armed with "a high-capacity, long-range flamethrower/a 120 mm torpedo-launching barrel/an automatic anti-tank gun", as three separate projects. They were tested in parallel in order to decide which was to become the serially-produced version. The exact flamethrower used is not specified, but it is stated to have been a "serially-produced example, in common use with Romanian troops, but adapted to the new armored fighting vehicle". For the "torpedo-launching" variant, Katyusha rockets are stated to have been used, shot from a smoothbore barrel. A Romanian-produced shape charge round was also to be produced for it. While initially inaccurate, this weapon started becoming precise during later trials, following modifications. Despite the anti-tank version of the Mareșal, armed with the 75 mm gun, having become the variant that was given priority, the rocket launcher variant was not completely abandoned, as Captain Nicolae Anghel requested its development to be continued in January 1944. Due to the ambiguity of the sources, it is unclear whether the mortar-equipped prototype and the rocket-firing one were separate projects or the same vehicle firing different types of ammunition.

M-00

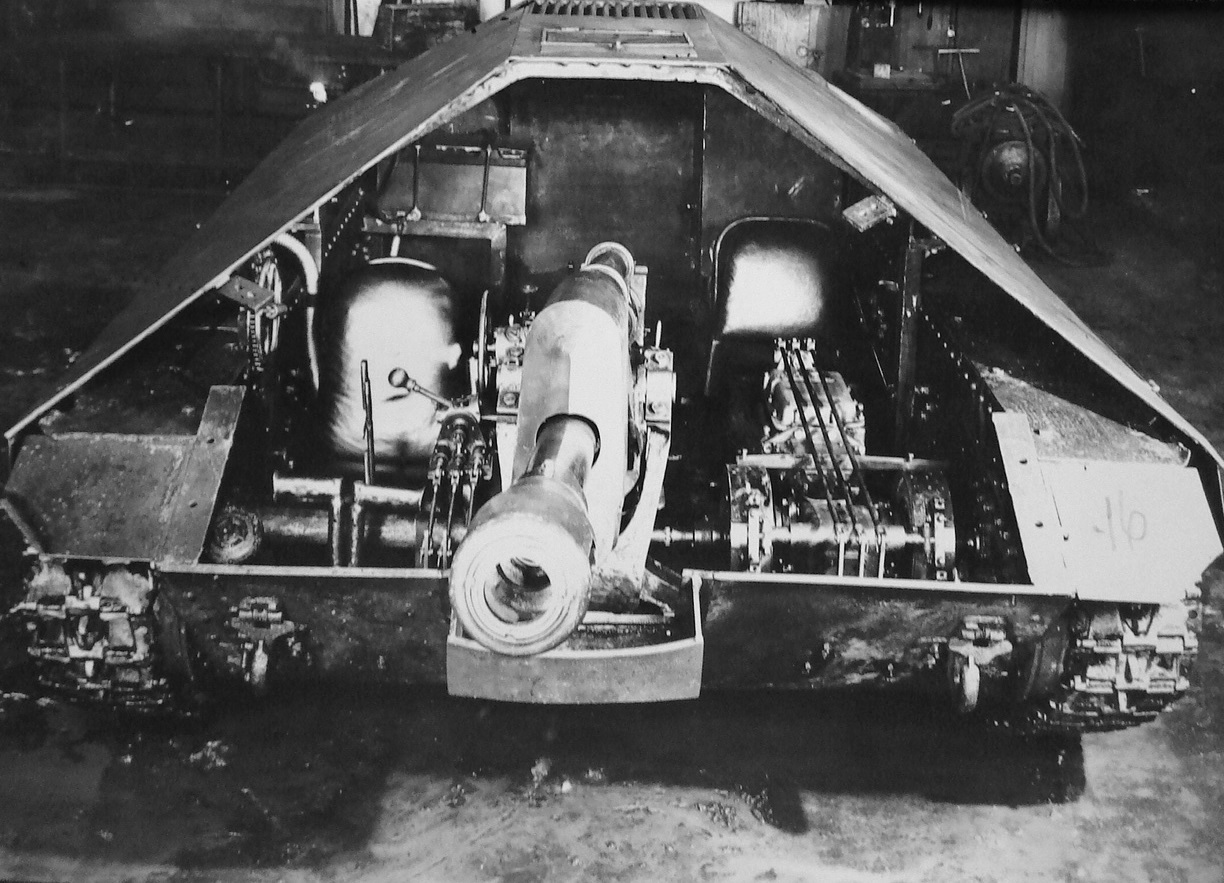
Front view of the M-00 prototype under construction, showing its interior layout. The Romanians had attached a muzzle brake to the 122 mm howitzer.

The next model, which was the first one to have the general shape of every subsequent prototype, was designated M-00. It was created by mounting a 122 mm M1938 (M-30) howitzer (incorrectly described as a "Putilov-Obukhov M1904/30" howitzer in Romanian documents) and a 7.92 mm ZB-30 light machine gun on the chassis of a captured T-60 light tank, which had its turret and superstructure replaced by tortoise-shaped sloped armor angled at 45°. The howitzer was modified by the Romanians by the attachment of a muzzle brake, to reduce its recoil. While the German StuG III ausf G had its machine gun mounted above the main gun, firing through a hole in the gun mantlet, the Romanians had chosen a rather unusual solution for the Mareșal, by also internally mounting the light machine gun, but having it fire through the howitzer's barrel. This feature was to be removed from late prototypes and serial production vehicles, which had firing ports on their side plates.

Finished in early July 1943, M-00 was tested at the Sudiți proving ground later that same month. There was some controversy beforehand, some specialists maintaining that the vehicle could not withstand a test firing and could even turn over because of the gun's recoil. They were wrong, but the trials did reveal a number of deficiencies, such as a failure of the bolts securing the gun mounting, track slippage, a rather weak engine and a cramped interior, among others. However, tests were deemed sufficiently promising to encourage further development.

M-00 had a crew of two, IOR Șeptilici A/T-type sights and a Ford V8 85 hp engine, along with a Ford V8 gearbox. The T-60 tracks were widened. The prototype weighed 6.7 tonnes and its armor was 20–30 mm thick. It used a manual steering control system from the T-60. Unlike the following prototypes, M-00 did not have a radio as the vehicle was only intended for testing purposes and thus did not need one. M-00 retained the T-60's electrics, while the next prototypes used Rogifer-designed ones. The transmission was also retained from the Soviet light tank.

M-01, M-02 and M-03

The "M" Staff, a special committee directly responsible to Antonescu's cabinet, was entrusted with the Mareșal project's supervision from August 1943, because production would require the involvement of an increasing variety of military and industrial agencies. The construction team was allocated a workshop at Rogifer, and by mid-October 1943, they had constructed three improved models, M-01, M-02 and M-03, all three of them having used the same 122 mm howitzer as M-00.

M-01 weighed around 6.7 tonnes—same as M-00—and was built on an enlarged, reinforced T-60 chassis. It used an improved 120-140 hp Buick engine and a 75 hp Opel Blitz gear box. Controls and suspension were retained from the T-60, but improved. It was tested at Sudiți on 23 October 1943, along with M-02 and M-03, in the presence of Marshal Antonescu. M-01 proved to have a greater speed and mobility than M-00, but most other problems were not overcome, including the cramped interior.

The Mareșal prototypes had progressively started to give up on the T-60 chassis. M-02 used a Rogifer-built chassis based on that of the T-60, but enlarged and reinforced. It weighed less than M-01 at around 6.4 tonnes. The engine, gear box, suspension and electrics were the same as on M-01. It used a Rogifer-designed pedal-steering control system with a manual clutch and accelerator. Both M-01 and M-02 retained M-00's armor thickness of 20–30 mm. M-02's best improvement over M-01 was a better gun mounting system, but the main problem of a cramped interior was yet to overcome.

M-03's components were identical to those of M-02, but its chassis was again longer and wider than those of the former prototypes. It had entirely given up on the T-60 chassis, but still used said tank's tracks. It weighed between 6.4 and 6.7 tonnes and had the thinnest armor of every prototype, at 10 mm overall. M-03 was the first prototype to overcome the problem of its interior space being too narrow.

All three prototypes had retained the T-60's transmission.

M-04

Worked on from November 1943 to January 1944, M-04 was the first prototype to have given up on the 122 mm howitzer in favor of the Romanian 75 mm Reșița M1943 gun, which was possibly the most versatile gun of its class developed during World War II, according to author Mark Axworthy. Said gun had been in parallel development with the Mareșal. M-04's blueprints were presented to Hitler and influenced the German Hetzer's development. The vehicle was fitted with a new 120 hp Hotchkiss H-39 engine.

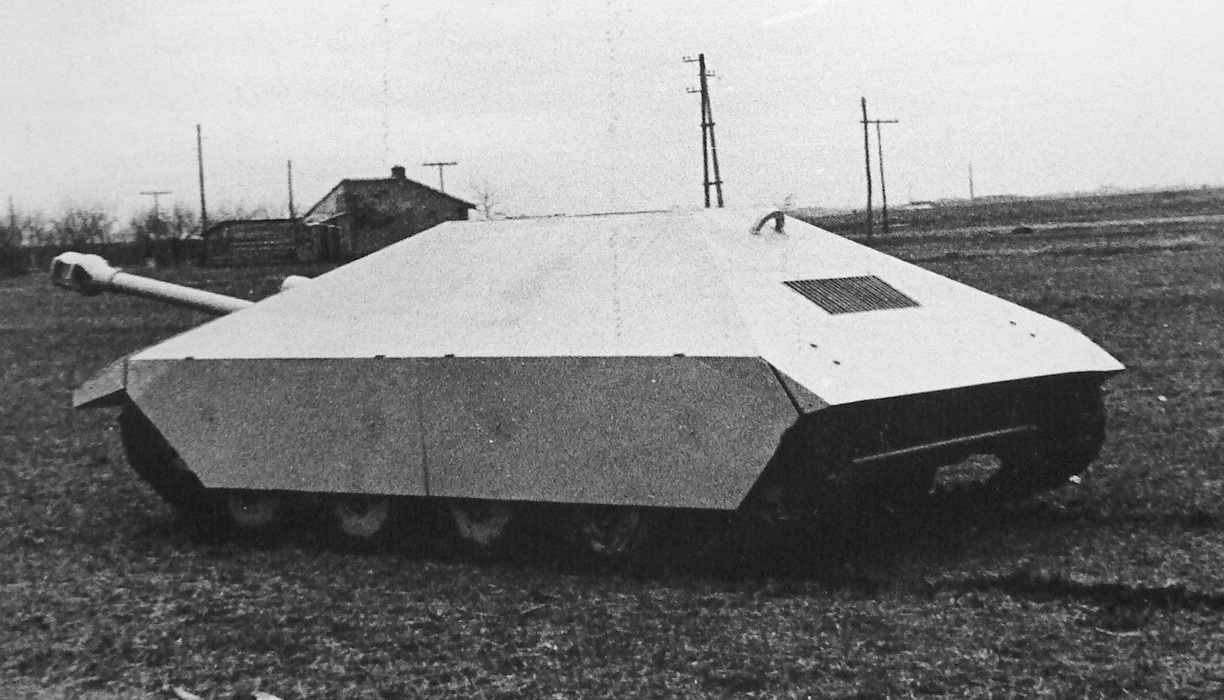
M-04 prototype. The casemate plates are most likely of metal painted in white, giving the wrong impression of a wooden mock-up. Side skirts may be of wood.

It was tested at Sudiți in early February 1944 in the presence of German Lieutenant-Colonels Ventz and Haymann (delegates of the Waffenamt and OKH, respectively), who were impressed by the mobility of the Mareșal and the viability of the novel design solution. They asked if the builders of M-04 had previously designed armored vehicles. Upon receiving a negative reply, Ventz commented that this accounted for the novelty of the vehicle.

M-04, which was also known by the codename "Cd. A. 43", used the same optics as the previous prototypes, but improved with an IOR panoramic telescope. It had a new half-hexagon shape. Its armor, produced by the Reșița Works, was 10–20 mm thick, but Ventz proposed its thickness to be increased to 30 mm, according to a report by Colonel R. Davidescu. Haymann, on the other hand, disagreed about increasing armor thickness, since it would have decreased mobility, which he believed was the tank destroyer's key feature. Romanian officials stated they will attempt materializing Ventz's proposal after testing a Soviet 45 mm gun's firepower at the Sudiți polygon. The vehicle, along with the next prototypes, retained M-03's pedal steering system. A new transmission from Hotchkiss was used. The only remaining T-60 component were the tracks, widened to 26 cm, everything else having been produced by Rogifer. The prototype's weight was of 7.5 tonnes.

M-04's frontal armor plate had an angle of 25°; its horizontal gun traverse was of 15°, which the two German officials described as "certainly sufficient" due to the ease of turning the vehicle; gun elevation was of -5°/+10°, also considered sufficient; the vehicle carried 45 rounds of ammunition; its speed, low profile and high shell velocity made it possible to fire at closer ranges and with more accuracy, lowering ammunition consumption.

M-05 and M-06

By March 1944, the Romanian design team was working on the M-05 and M-06 prototypes, the final series of prototypes, which were to be the basis for the serial production vehicles. They were largely Romanian-built, the main remaining foreign components having been the Hotchkiss engine and gear box, a new ČKD suspension, a German Telefunken U.K.W.E.e 10W radio and part of the sights. M-05 was completed in May 1944 and was tested in the same month.

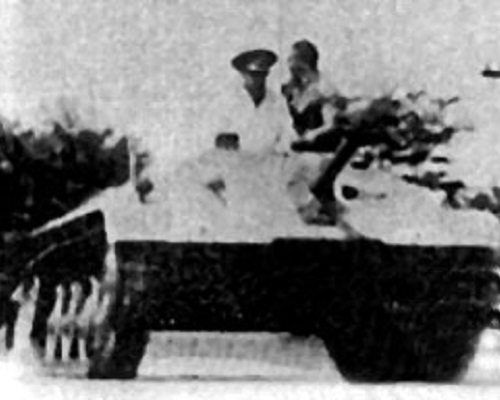
M-05 prototype during trials. Notice that it is wider than M-00 and M-04 and does not use side skirts.

In June 1944, the M-05 prototype proved to be superior to the German StuG III G, after competing against it for testing purposes in the presence of Marshal Antonescu. The Mareșal performed best in firing, speed, handling, slope management and obstacle clearance. It was much praised by the attending German officers. From 24 July to 21 August, M-05 underwent further confirmatory tests which were then interrupted by a failure in the gun mounting. By 23 August 1944 (when King Michael's Coup took place), M-05 had completed its proving program with the exception of its endurance trial. On 21 September 1944, test firings and endurance trials were resumed with good results.

M-05 retained many components of M-04, but differed greatly in shape, having been wider and having stopped using side skirts. It also used the new ČKD suspension instead of the T-60's one, as well as the new German radio. The transmission was also new, having been built by Rogifer. The 10–20 mm thick armor was produced by Böhler. The prototype weighed 8.5 tonnes and had an appreciable maximum speed of 50 km/h on road and 35 km/h off-road. Its secondary armament had consisted of two submachine guns shot through firing ports on each of the vehicle's side armor plates. M-05 had the same gun elevation as M-04. Its upper frontal armor plate was angled at 25°, while the upper side and rear plates had angles of 33 and 30°, respectively.

Despite being praised by the Germans, M-05 had also faced criticism, most notably from General Vasile Atanasiu and Vice Admiral Alexandru Gheorghiu. Both had stated that the prototype had poor sights and that the "exaggerated angling" of the armor affected the crew's performance.

M-06 was the last prototype and the only one to have a crew of three. The third crew member had the commander role, while the two others had retained the roles they had on the previous prototypes: driver-aimer-gunner and loader-radio operator. M-06's development had begun simultaneously with that of M-05, to which it was very similar. Its 10–20 mm thick armor was produced by Reșița under license from Böhler. Mark Axworthy describes M-06 as being identical in characteristics to M-05 apart from the extra crew member. According to Czech historian Ivo Pejčoch, M-06 was identical to M-05, but with technological changes in the gun mount.

==== Series production ====
The serial production vehicles were based on the M-05 and M-06 prototypes. While the first 200 were planned to be M-05 copies, the next 800 would have differed from each other, being based on M-06 while also incorporating lessons learnt from "Series 0", thus getting progressively modified. They were to be equipped with anti-magnetic concrete and a multicolored camouflage scheme. The vehicles were to use the 75 Reșița M1943 gun, or, in case not enough said guns would have been produced in time, the Romanian-produced 75 mm Vickers-Reșița anti-aircraft gun (adapted as an AT gun) or another AT gun, such as a German one. Other AT guns available in Romania's inventory at the time included the German 7.5 cm Pak 40 or the captured Soviet 76 mm ZiS-3. The German 8.8 cm Flak 37 anti-aircraft gun was also available and was even proposed to be mounted as an AT gun on the TACAM R-2. A top-mounted 7.92 Rheinmetall machine gun for anti-aircraft defense and fending off enemy infantry was also considered as secondary armament, apart from the two 9 light machine guns that were also used on the M-05 prototype.

The almost completed "Series 0" of 10 vehicles, that was based on the M-05 prototype, used 120 hp Hotchkiss engines. The next 40 Mareșals ("Series 1") would have used the same type of engine. Those first 50 vehicles were the only ones to use Hotchkiss engines, since their French factory was bombed by the Allies, with only 50 engines being evacuated. The next vehicles were to use 160 hp Praga engines, which were also to be produced in Romania under license, or uprated 220 hp Tatra engines supplied by Germany.

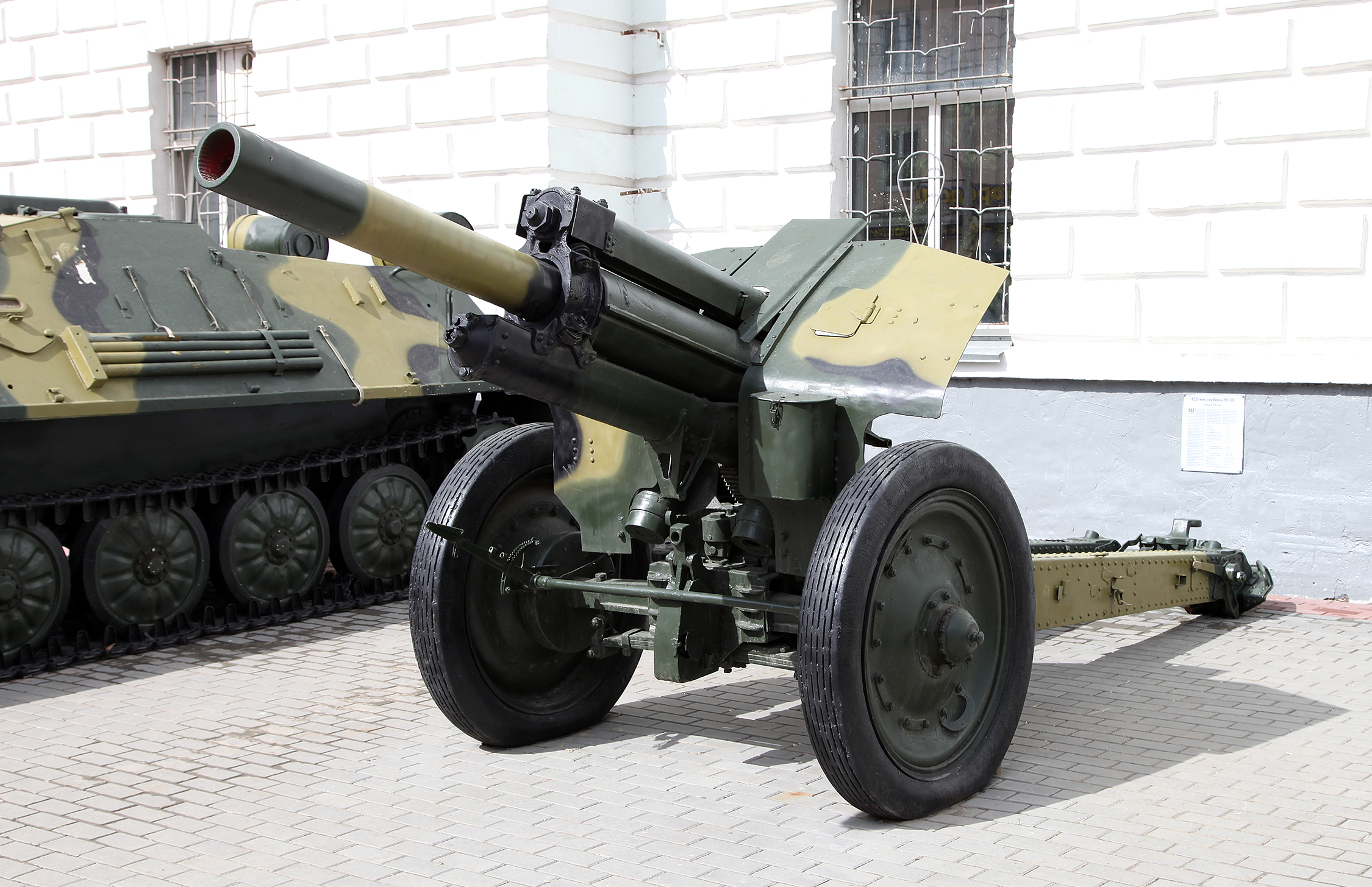
122 mm M1938 (M-30) howitzer, used on the first prototypes

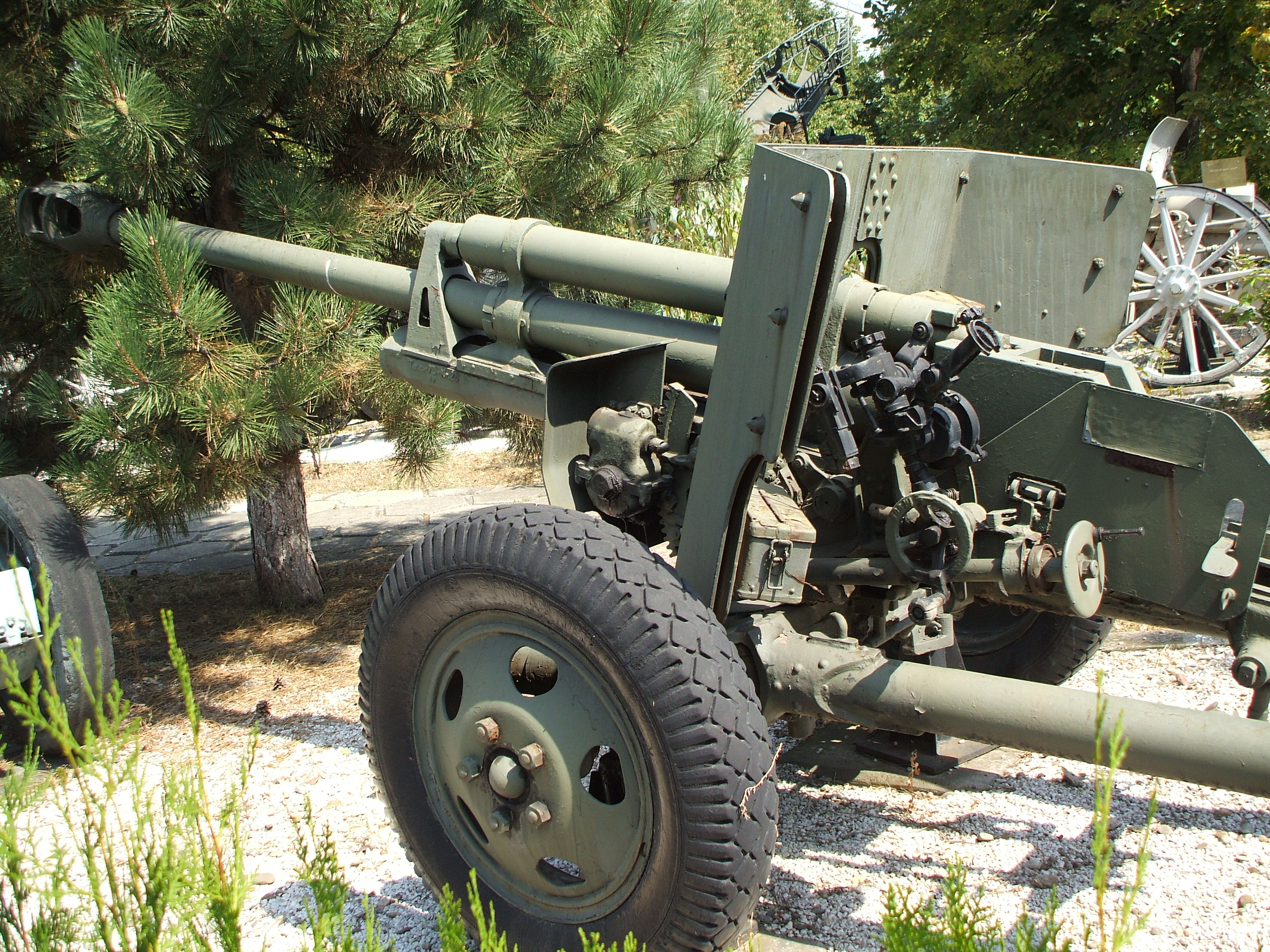
The 75 mm Reșița M1943, which was considered one of the best 75 mm AT guns of its era, was used on later prototypes and serial production vehicles

Comparison of prototypes and serial production vehicles
Vehicle	Crew	Armament	Armor (mm)	Chassis	Weight	Engine
M-00	2	122 mm M1938 (M-30)	20–30	T-60	6.7 t	85 hp Ford V8
M-01	2	122 M1938 (M-30)	20–30	T-60	±6.7 t	120-140 hp Buick
M-02	2	122 M1938 (M-30)	20–30	Romanian-built	±6.4 t	120-140 hp Buick
M-03	2	122 M1938 (M-30)	10	Romanian-built	6.4-6.7 t	120-140 hp Buick
M-04	2	75 mm Reșița M1943	10–20	Romanian-built	7.5 t	120 hp Hotchkiss H-39
M-05	2	75 Reșița M1943	10–20	Romanian-built	8.5 t	120 hp Hotchkiss H-39
M-06	3	75 Reșița M1943	10–20	Romanian-built	±8.5 t	120 hp Hotchkiss H-39
Serial prod.	2/3	75 Reșița M1943 or others (see above)	10–20	Romanian-built	±8.5 t	120 hp Hotchkiss H-39/ 160 hp Praga AC/ 220 hp Tatra T-103

==== Proposed 88 mm gun variant ====
Colonel Davidescu's January 1944 report mentions the proposal to arm the Mareșal with the "75 mm Vickers anti-aircraft gun, adapted as an anti-tank gun", in case not enough 75 mm Reșița M1943 guns were to be produced in time. A later report from June 1944 describes how this anti-tank gun adaptation of the 75 mm Vickers was materialized, and its caliber was increased to 88 mm. During trials, this new Romanian 88 mm anti-tank gun was compared to a German 88 mm Flak gun. The Romanian gun performed better in terms of rounds per minute (25 compared to 20 of the German gun), combat weight (4,5 t compared to 7,5 t of the German gun) and traveling weight (4,5 t compared to 5 t of the German gun). In other aspects, the two guns were similar. The new 88 mm gun was also proposed to be mounted on the R-2 light tank chassis (see TACAM R-2). Only four examples are known to have been produced in the short time that remained before Romania was overrun by Soviet forces.

=== Self-propelled howitzer ===
A planned self-propelled howitzer variant of the Mareșal existed, whose role was to be supporting infantry. Its blueprints were presented by the Romanians to German Lieutenant-Colonels Ventz and Haymann, who—according to Colonel R. Davidescu—found them "judiciously prepared". Lieutenant-Colonel Paul Drăghiescu was the first one to propose it in autumn 1943.

The vehicle would have carried a howitzer of either 122 or 150 mm. In addition to high-explosive shells, it would also have been equipped with HEAT ammunition to combat tanks effectively. Due to its bigger size, this variant's crew was to be increased to three or even four members. The vehicle was to have a gun elevation of 23° (comparable to the 25° of the similar German Sturm-Infanteriegeschütz 33B), allowing it to fire up to distances of 6.5 km.

The variant was never produced, because the tank destroyer version was given priority. It was taken into consideration to produce it in case not enough 75 mm Reșița anti-tank guns would have been produced in time for the tank destroyer variant. Germany, however, had built a similar vehicle based on the Hetzer chassis and armed with a 15 cm sIG 33 howitzer, the 15 cm schweres Infanteriegeschütz 33/2 (Sf) auf Jagdpanzer 38(t).

=== Anti-aircraft vehicle ===
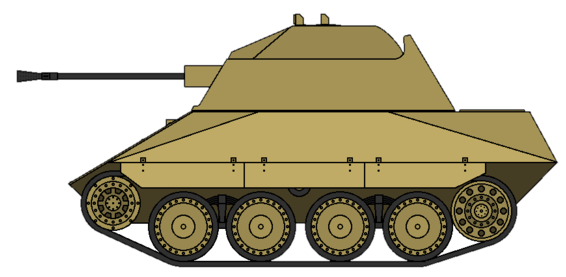
Artist's impression of a German Flakpanzer version, based on other turreted Flakpanzers

==== Romanian variant ====
Another variant of the Mareșal planned by the Romanians was that of a self-propelled anti-aircraft gun (SPAAG). Just like the self-propelled howitzer version, this vehicle was first proposed around October 1943 by Lieutenant-Colonel Drăghiescu. It was to be armed with multiple anti-aircraft guns of a caliber from 20 to 37 mm and was to be less numerous than the tank destroyer and self-propelled howitzer variants. Anti-aircraft guns possessed by Romania at the time were the 20 mm Oerlikon cannon and the 20 mm Gustloff (both delivered by Germany), as well as the 3.7 cm Flak 37 built under license in Romania.

==== German Flakpanzer variant ====
German plan to buy several Mareșal chassis for the Wehrmacht and arm them with 37 mm Rheinmetall anti-aircraft guns. Never materialized, since the royal coup d'état had made Romania defect from the Axis powers.

=== Command vehicle version ===
Squads of four Mareșals were planned to be used in combat. Every squad was to consist of three tank destroyers and one command vehicle equipped with machine guns, a flamethrower and a radio station. This vehicle was to have a crew of three: a squad commander, a driver and a gunner. The commander was to be seated centrally and observe the battlefield through a device that could be opened and shut. The device had a c. 100 mm wide opening that allowed the commander to observe the surroundings at 360° through a 10 cm thick bulletproof layer of plexiglass.

== Operators ==
- Kingdom of Romania – main operator. Used only for testing and crew training, having never seen action because of the Soviets stopping its production.
- Soviet Union (probably) – after October 1944, the vehicles were probably captured by the Soviets, who had occupied Romania
- Nazi Germany (planned) – planned acquisition to build a Flakpanzer version (see above)

== See also ==
- Romanian armored fighting vehicle production during World War II
- TACAM T-60 – Romanian tank destroyer also based on the T-60 chassis, like the first two Mareșal prototypes

=== Comparable vehicles ===
- Germany: Hetzer • StuG III • StuG IV • Jagdpanzer IV
- Italy: Semovente da 75/34 • Semovente da 75/46
- Soviet Union: SU-85
- United Kingdom: Alecto • Archer
- United States: M10 GMC

== Sources ==
- Abbott, Peter; Thomas, Nigel (November 25, 1982). Germany's Eastern Allies 1941–45. Oxford, UK: Osprey Publishing. ISBN 0850454751.
- Afrim, Constantin; Barbu, Florin; Băjenaru, Gheorghe; Butuc, Dobrică; Cană, Ion; Constantin, Dumitru; Ghinoiu, Marin; Mitu, Nicolae; Stroea, Adrian (2008). "165 de ani de existență a artileriei române moderne" [165 Years of Modern Romanian Artillery]. Revista Forțelor Terestre (in Romanian). Bucharest: Staff of the Romanian Land Forces.
- Axworthy, Mark (1995). Third Axis, Fourth Ally: Romanian Armed Forces in the European War, 1941–1945. London: Arms and Armour. ISBN 9781854092670.
- Axworthy, Mark; Șerbănescu, Horia Vl. (1991). The Romanian Army of World War 2. Oxford, UK: Osprey Publishing. ISBN 1-85532-169-6.
- Chiriță, Mihai; Moșneagu, Marian; Florea, Petrișor; Duță, Cornel (July 2009). "Preocupări ale factorilor militari de decizie pe linia înzestrării cu tancuri a armatei române în perioada 1919-1944" [Concerns of the Decisive Military Staff on the Topic of Tank Endowment in the Romanian Army from 1919 to 1944]. In Dobre, Florica; Dobre, Dumitru (eds.). Statul Major General în Arhitectura Organismului Militar Românesc [Role of the General Staff in Building the Romanian Military's Structure] (PDF) (in Romanian). Pitești, Romania: Centrul Tehnic-Editorial al Armatei București. Archived from the original (PDF) on 2021-01-19.
- Crăciunoiu, Cristian [in Romanian] (1999). "Modelism (Internațional) Nr. 4/1999" [Modelling (International), No. 4/1999]. Modelism (Internațional) (in Romanian). Bucharest.
- Davidescu, Radu. "Cabinetul Militar al Conducătorului Statului, Nr. 201.005 [Military Cabinet of the State Leader, No. 201.005]" (April 3, 1944) [Textual record]. Cabinetul Militar al Conducătorului Statului 1940–44 [Military Cabinet of the State Leader, 1940–44]. Bucharest & Pitești, Romania: Ministry of National Defence (Romania) (Ministerul Apărării Naționale—MApN).
- Deletant, Dennis (2006). Hitler's Forgotten Ally. Ion Antonescu and His Regime, Romania 1940-44. Hampshire and New York: Palgrave Macmillan. ISBN 9781403993410.
- Dicționarul explicativ al limbii române (ediția a II-a revăzută și adăugită) [Explanatory Dictionary of the Romanian Language (Second Edition, Revised and Expanded)] (in Romanian). Bucharest: Editura Univers Enciclopedic Gold. 2009.
- Gheorghe, Viorel (2020). "Încercări de dezvoltare a tehnicii militare românești în anii celui de-al Doilea Război Mondial" [Attempts of Developing Romanian Military Technology During the Years of the Second World War] (PDF). Buletinul Arhivelor Militare Române [Journal of the Romanian Military Archives] (in Romanian). 2 (88): 71–79. ISSN 1454-0924.
- Gil-Martínez, Eduardo M. (September 20, 2018). Romanian Armored Forces in World War II. Lublin, Poland: Kagero. ISBN 978-8395157530.
- Kliment, Charles K.; Francev, Vladimír (January 1, 2004). Czechoslovak Armored Fighting Vehicles 1918–1948. Atglen, Pennsylvania, USA: Schiffer Publishing. ISBN 0764301411.
- Moșneagu, Marian [in Romanian]; Boțoghină, Iulian-Stelian; Manolescu, Mariana-Daniela; Stoica, Leontin-Vasile; Șoitariu, Mihai-Cosmin (2012). Armata română și evoluția armei tancuri. Documente (1919–1945) [The Romanian Army and the Evolution of the Tank Weapon. Documents (1919–1945)] (PDF) (in Romanian). Pitești, Romania: Pitești University / Romanian National Military Archives. ISBN 978-606-560-252-6.
- Nestorescu, Valerian (1972). File din trecutul artileriei române moderne [Pages from the Past of Modern Romanian Artillery] (in Romanian). Bucharest: Editura Militară.
- Pejčoch, Ivo [in Czech]; Pejs, Oldřich (2005). Obrněná technika 6: Střední Evropa 1919–1945 (II. část) [Armored Vehicles 6: Central Europe 1919–1945 (Part 2)] (in Czech). Prague: Vašut. ISBN 8072364294.
- Scafeș, Cornel (2004). "Buletinul Muzeului Național Militar, Nr. 2/2004" [Bulletin of the National Military Museum, No. 2/2004]. Journal of the Romanian National Military Museum (in Romanian). Bucharest: Total Publishing: 210–237.
- Scafeș, Cornel; Șerbănescu, Horia Vl.; Scafeș, Ioan I. (2011) [2005]. Trupele blindate din Armata Română (1919–1947) [Armored Troops of the Romanian Army (1919–1947)] (in Romanian). Bucharest: Alpha MDN. ISBN 9789731390741.
- Son, Dumitru. "Comandamentul trupelor motomecanizate, dosar Nr. 158/1944" (1944) [Textual record]. Comandamentul trupelor motomecanizate [Mechanized Troops' Command]. Bucharest & Pitești, Romania: Ministry of National Defence (Romania) (Ministerul Apărării Naționale—MApN).
- Spielberger, Walter J.; Doyle, Hilary Louis (2007) [1977]. Special Panzer Variants: Development • Production • Operations. Atglen, Pennsylvania, USA: Schiffer Publishing. ISBN 978-0764326226.
- Stroea, Adrian; Băjenaru, Gheorghe (2010). Artileria română în date și imagini [Romanian Artillery in Data and Images] (PDF) (in Romanian). Bucharest: Editura Centrului Tehnic-Editorial al Armatei. ISBN 9786065240803.
- Ștefănescu, Alexandru V. (2020). În umbra marelui Reich: Tehnica de luptă a armatei române pe Frontul de Est (1941–1944) [In the Shadow of the Great Reich: Battle Technique of the Romanian Army on the Eastern Front (1941–1944)] (in Romanian). Târgoviște, Romania: Cetatea de Scaun. ISBN 9786065375055.
- Zaloga, Steven J. (2013). Tanks of Hitler's Eastern Allies 1941–45. Oxford, UK: Osprey Publishing. ISBN 978-1-78096-020-3.
- "Betr. Sperre der rumänischen Guthaben" (February 9, 1950) [Textual record]. Rogifer SA., Bukarest. Bern, Switzerland: Swiss Federal Archives.
