= Kugelblitz (armoured fighting vehicle) =

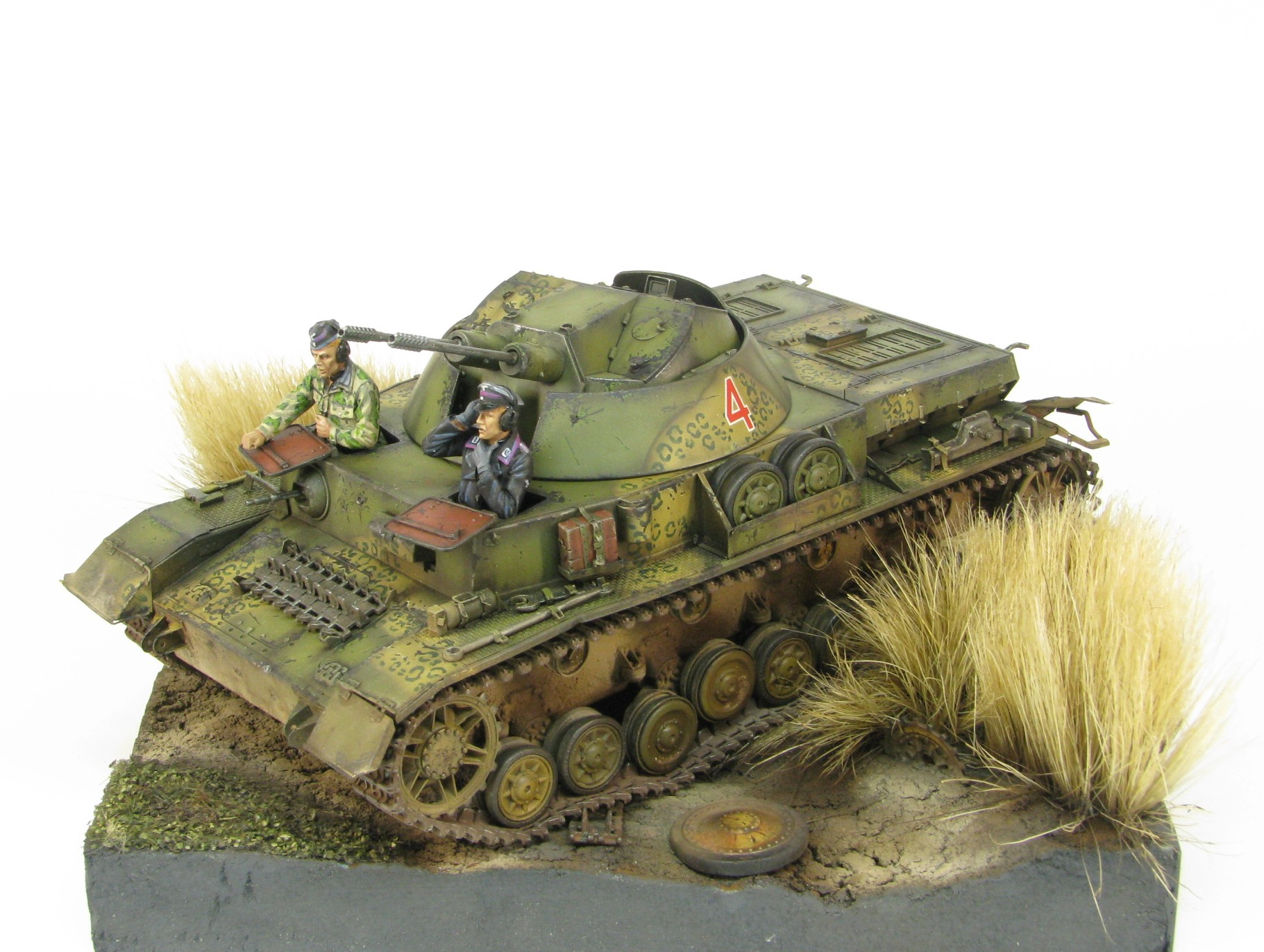
- 1/35 scale model of a Kugelblitz
- Type: Self-propelled anti-aircraft gun
- Place of origin: Nazi Germany

Production history
- Produced: 1945
- No. built: 5

Specifications
- Mass: 23 tonnes
- Length: 5.92 m (19 ft 5 in)
- Width: 2.95 m (9 ft 8 in)
- Height: 2.4 m (7 ft 10 in)
- Crew: 5 (commander, two gunners, radio operator, driver)
- Armor: 80 mm (3.1 in) maximum
- Main armament: Zwillingsflak 30mm MK 103 twin anti-aircraft gun
- Secondary armament: 7.92 mm MG34
- Engine: 12-cylinder Maybach HL120 TRM gasoline 300 PS (296 hp, 221 kW)
- Power/weight: 13 PS/tonne
- Fuel capacity: 470 L (120 US gal)
- Operational range: 200 km (120 mi)
- Maximum speed: 38 km/h (24 mph)

The Flakpanzer IV Kugelblitz (German for "ball lightning") was a German self-propelled anti-aircraft gun developed during World War II. By the end of the war, only a pilot production of five units had been completed. Unlike earlier self-propelled anti-aircraft guns, it had a fully enclosed, rotating turret.

== Development ==
The need for a specialised self-propelled anti-aircraft gun, capable of keeping up with the armoured divisions, had become increasingly urgent for the German Armed Forces, as from 1943 on the German Air Force was less and less able to protect itself against enemy fighter bombers.

Therefore, a multitude of improvised and specially designed self-propelled anti-aircraft guns were built, many on the Panzer IV chassis, starting with the Flakpanzer IV Möbelwagen (a stopgap design) and progressing through the Wirbelwind and Ostwind models. However, these designs were tall, open-topped designs with sub-optimal armor. These flaws were to be eliminated in the Kugelblitz, the final development of the Flakpanzer IV.

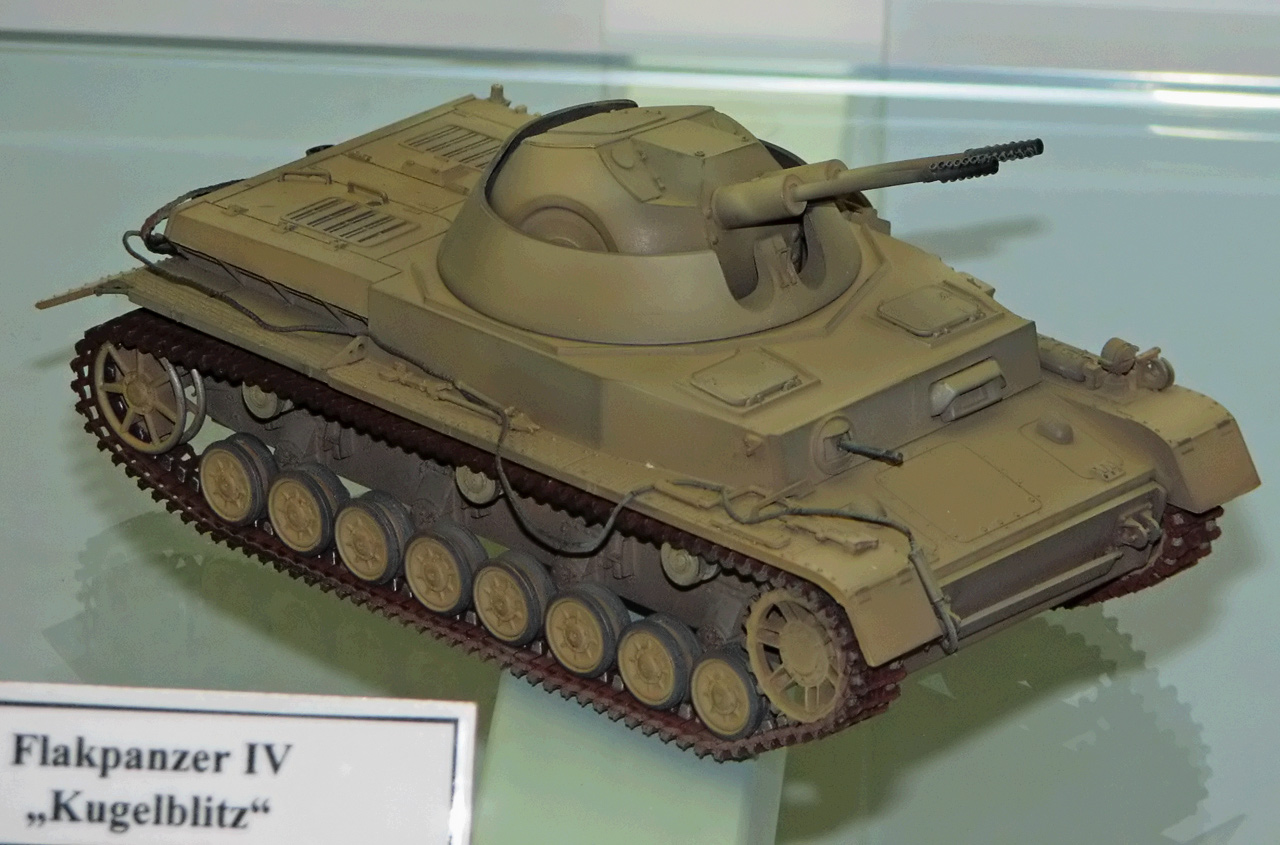
"Kugelblitz" (Model)

General Heinz Guderian was shown several Flakpanzer projects for consideration in May 1944, one of which was the Leichte Flakpanzer IV 3 cm sketches created by Oberleutnant Josef von Glatter-Gotz. This design was chosen by Guderian, with Daimler-Benz to produce the vehicle and the armament to be created by Rheinmetall.

The first proposal for the Kugelblitz envisioned mounting a modified anti-aircraft turret developed for U-boats on the Panzer IV chassis, which was armed with dual 30 mm MK 303 Brünn guns (a configuration known as Doppelflak, "dual flak"). This was however abandoned as impractical, as development of this gun had not yet been completed, and in any case the entire production run of this gun turret was reserved for Nazi Germany's Kriegsmarine. Instead, the Kugelblitz used the 30 mm MK 103/Pz cannon in a Zwillingsflak ("twin flak") 103/38 arrangement. The MK 103 had also been fitted in single mounts to such planes as the Henschel Hs 129 in a ventral gun pod, and to the twin-engined Dornier Do 335. Each 30mm gun could fire 450 rounds a minute.

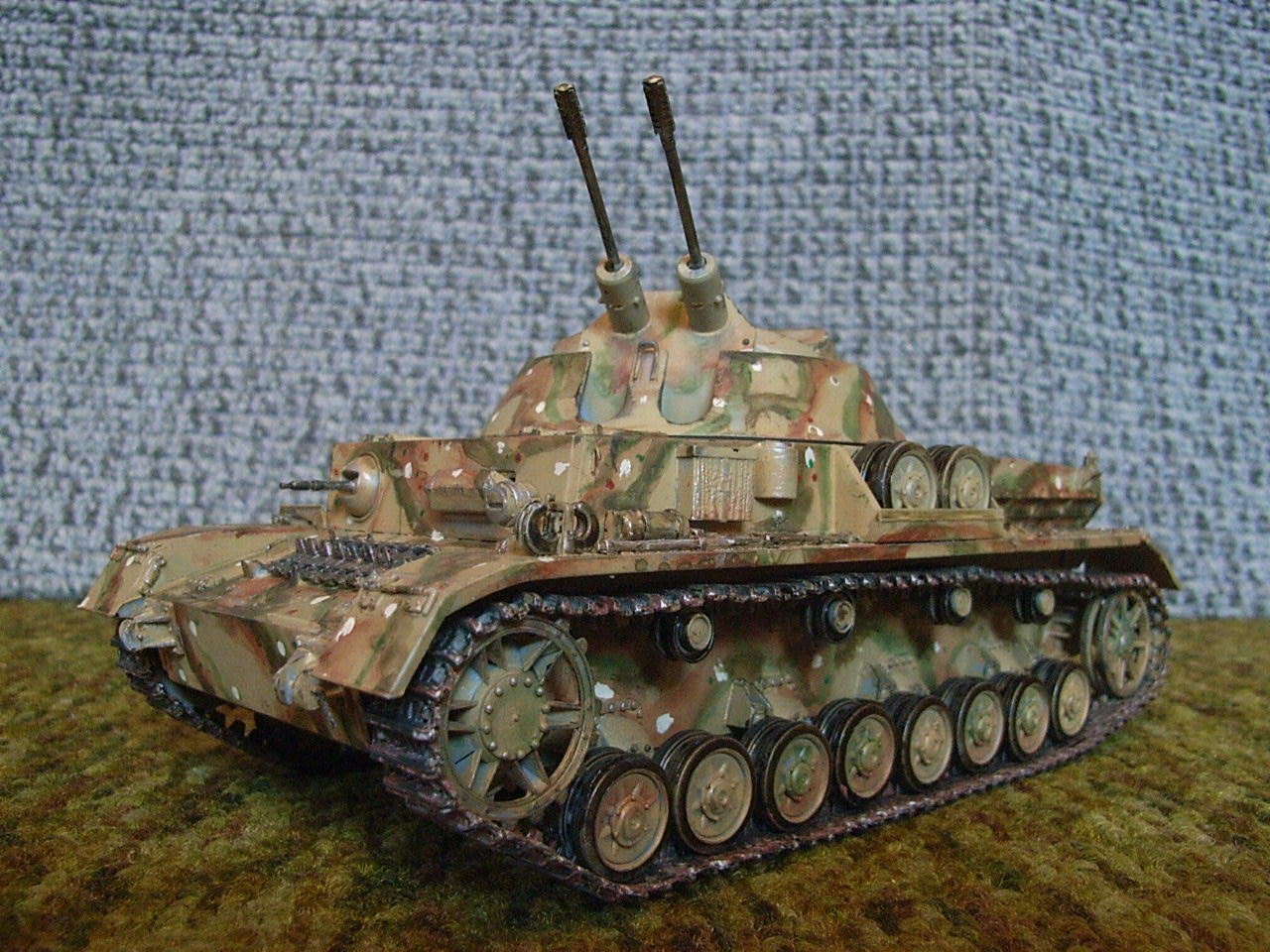
"Kugelblitz" model, showing gun elevation

The Kugelblitz combined the chassis and basic superstructure of the Panzer IV tank with a newly designed oscillating turret. This turret was fully enclosed, with overhead protection and 360° traverse. Mass production was planned, but never happened due to the disruption by Allied bombing efforts.

Other versions of the Kugelblitz were planned. One version would have two 20 mm and two 30 mm cannons, with the 20 mm cannons used as targeting guns. Tests of radar and even infra-red equipment were conducted. In November 1944 a proposed plan to combine a Hetzer hull with the Kugeblitz turret was accepted, but never produced.

== Service ==
The Kugelblitz was not yet out of development when the war ended. Only five prototypes were built. One Kugelblitz was involved in the fights near the town of Spichra, Thuringia, where it was destroyed and remained buried in the Spatenberg Hill until its excavation in 1999. Two of the turrets were to be used as anti-aircraft guns in Berlin but it is unknown if they saw any action.

== Survivors ==
Today, one complete Kugelblitz turret is exhibited at the Lehrsammlung der Heeresflugabwehrschule (collection of the German army anti-aircraft school), Rendsburg. An incomplete Kugelblitz cradle also exists (without the turret itself) in a private collection.

== Comparable vehicles ==
- 40M Nimród – (Hungary)
- Crusader Mk. III Anti-Aircraft Tank Mk. I – (United Kingdom)
- M19 Multiple Gun Motor Carriage – (United States)
- ZSU-37 – (Soviet Union)

== Sources ==
- Chamberlain, Peter & Doyle, Hilary (1999) "Encyclopedia Of German Tanks Of World War Two"
- Doyle, Hilary Louis & Jentz, Thomas L. (2023). Flakpanzer IV and Other Flakpanzer Projects. Panzer Tracts. Vol. 12–1 (revised ed.). Old Heathfield, UK: Panzerwrecks. ISBN 978-1-915969-18-7.
- "Vor 60 Jahren: Die Kämpfe um Horchen, Spichra und Creuzburg - Teil 2" (in German). Milan.de. Retrieved 2011-07-17.
- Spielberger, Walter J., and Uwe Feist. Sturmartillerie. Fallbrook, CA: Aero, 1967.
- German Tanks of World War II: The Complete Illustrated history of German Armoured Fighting Vehicles 1926-1945, F. M. von Senger und Etterlin, translated by J. Lucas, Galahad Books, New York, 1969, ISBN 0-88365-051-7
- Karl R. Pawlas: The 3 cm Flak 103/38 and 103/Pz part 1-5, in "Waffen Revue Volume 93-96", Journal Verlag Schwend GmbH, Schwäbisch Hall 1994-1995
