= Flakpanzer =

German term for "anti aircraft tanks"

Flakpanzer is a German term for "anti-aircraft tanks" ("flak" is derived from Flugabwehrkanone, literally "aircraft defence cannon"; "panzer" is derived from Panzerkampfwagen, literally "armored fighting vehicle"). These vehicles are modified tanks whose armament was intended to engage aircraft, rather than targets on the ground.

Several vehicles with this name were used by the German Army during World War II. After the war, others were used by both the West German Bundeswehr and the East German National People's Army.

== World War II ==
- Flakpanzer I, a converted version of the Panzer I tank.
- Flakpanzer 38(t), based on the Panzer 38(t) light tank
- Flakpanzer IV, the general designation for a series of vehicles based on the Panzerkampfwagen IV medium tank chassis, including the:
  - Möbelwagen
  - Wirbelwind
  - Ostwind
  - Kugelblitz, in prototype stage at the end of World War II
- Flakpanzer Coelian, a prototype that reached the wooden mockup stage.
- Flakpanzer Mareșal, proposal

== Post war ==
- M42 Duster, an American vehicle used by the Bundeswehr and designated the Flakpanzer M42
- Flakpanzer Gepard, used by the Bundeswehr
- ZSU-57-2, used by the National People's Army of East Germany
- ZSU-23-4, used by the National People's Army of East Germany

== See also ==
- Self-propelled anti-aircraft weapon
