= 3 cm MK 303 Flak =

German anti-aircraft gun

3 cm MK 303 (Br)
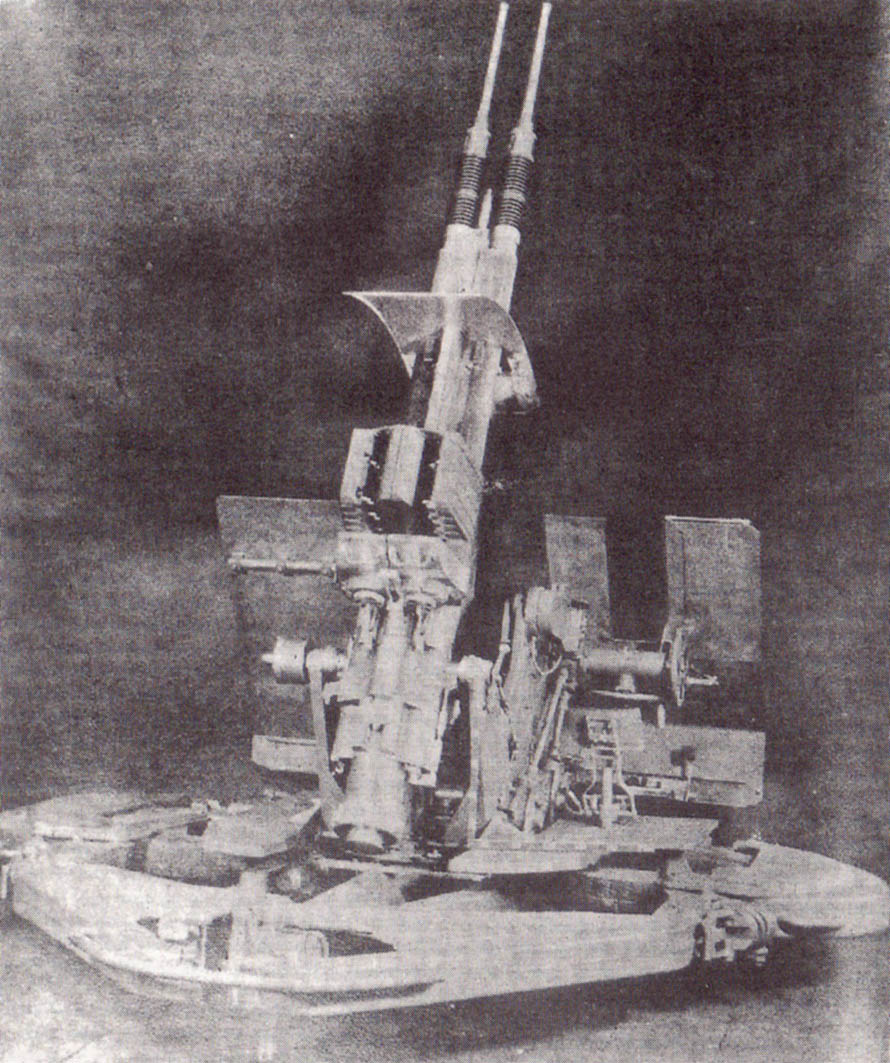
- 3cm MK 303 Flakzwilling, two 3 cm MK 303 in the twin mount
- Type: Anti-aircraft cannon
- Place of origin: Nazi Germany

Service history
- In service: unknown
- Used by: Nazi Germany
- Wars: World War II

Production history
- Manufacturer: Krieghoff
- Produced: 1944–1945
- No. built: 222 (32 in 1944 and 190 in 1945)
- Variants: 3 cm Flakzwilling MK 303 (Br)

Specifications
- Mass: 185 kg (408 lbs)
- Length: 3.145 m (10 ft 3.8 in)
- Barrel length: 2.2 m (7 ft 3 in) L/73
- Shell: 30×210mm
- Caliber: 30 mm (1.18 in)
- Elevation: -10°to ±85°
- Traverse: 360°
- Rate of fire: 400 rpm (cyclic)
- Muzzle velocity: 1100 m/s (3,609 ft/s) M-Schos; 900 m/s (2,953 ft/s) HE; 950 m/s (3,117 ft/s) AP/HE
- Feed system: 15 cartridge clip

The 3 cm MK 303 Flak and twin-mounted 3 cm MK 303 Flakzwilling (M44) were experimental 30 mm anti-aircraft guns developed in Nazi Germany. They fired the powerful 30x210mm round and only 222 were produced. The gun was to be installed on Type XXI submarines as AA defense and its use as AA defense replacing 2 cm Flak and 3.7 cm Flak weapons was also considered. The use of the 3 cm M.K. 303 Flakzwilling on the Flakpanzer IV "Kugelblitz" was considered, but rejected. The development began in late 1941 and production started in late 1944.

== Post-war use ==
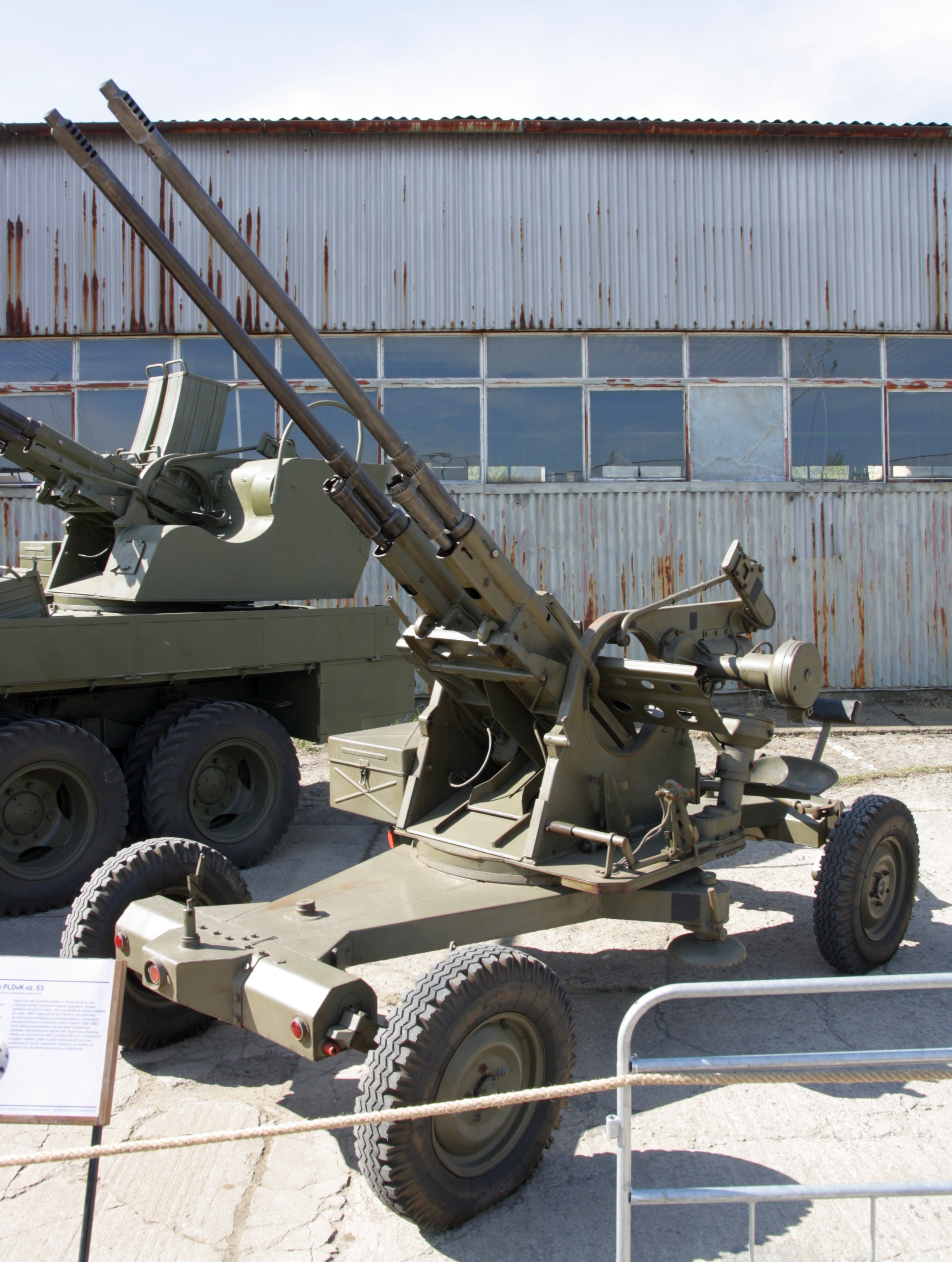
Postwar PLDvK vz. 53 of Czechoslovak army

In the 50s, the MK 303 was produced in Czechoslovakia under the designation M53, with the clip feed replaced by a 10-round box magazine. It was also used as the armament of the SPAAG M53/59 Praga.
