= List of submarines of World War II =

This is a list of submarines of World War II, which began with the German invasion of Poland on 1 September 1939 and ended with the surrender of Japan on 2 September 1945.

Germany used submarines to devastating effect in the Battle of the Atlantic, where it attempted to cut Britain's supply routes by sinking more merchant ships than Britain could replace. While U-boats destroyed a significant number of ships, the strategy ultimately failed. Although U-boats had been updated in the interwar years, the major innovation was improved communications and encryption; allowing for mass-attack naval tactics. By the end of the war, almost 3,000 Allied ships (175 warships, 2,825 merchantmen) had been sunk by U-boats.

The Imperial Japanese Navy operated the most varied fleet of submarines of any navy, including Kaiten crewed torpedoes, midget submarines (Type A Ko-hyoteki and Kairyu classes), medium-range submarines, purpose-built supply submarines and long-range fleet submarines. They also had submarines with the highest submerged speeds (I-201-class submarines) and submarines that could carry multiple aircraft (I-400-class submarines). They were also equipped with one of the most advanced torpedoes of the conflict, the oxygen-propelled Type 95.

The submarine force was the most effective anti-ship weapon in the United States Navy arsenal. Although constituting only about 2 percent of the U.S. naval force, submarine force destroyed over 30 percent of the Imperial Japanese Navy, and over 60 percent of the Japanese merchant fleet, The Royal Navy Submarine Service was used primarily to blockade trade and military supply routes to Africa and the Near and Far East, but also obtained the only mutually submerged submarine-to-submarine combat kill of World War II. This occurred when the crew of HMS Venturer engaged the U-864, manually computed a successful firing solution against a three-dimensional moving target using techniques which became the basis of modern torpedo computer targeting systems.

Excluding special underwater craft such as midget submarines, the German Kriegsmarine lost 765 submarines to all causes during World War II in addition to 150 submarines scuttled in German-held ports in northern Europe during the first week of May 1945 by their crews to avoid surrendering them to the Allies, while Japan lost 129 submarines and Italy 91. The Royal Navy lost 73 and the U.S. Navy 52 submarines, while France lost 59. The Soviet Union′s submarine losses are not necessarily fully known, but the Soviet Navy probably lost 98 submarines.

Submarines show submerged displacement in long tons.

List of submarines of World War II
Name	Operator	Class	Type	Submerged displacement (long tons)	First commissioned	Fate
Acciaio	Regia Marina	Acciaio	coastal submarine	864	30 October 1941	Sunk 13 July 1943
Achéron	French Navy	Redoutable	cruiser submarine	1,968	22 February 1932	Scuttled 27 November 1942; refloated July 1943; sunk 24 November 1943
Achille	French Navy	Redoutable	cruiser submarine	1,968	29 June 1933	Scuttled 18 June 1940
Actéon	French Navy	Redoutable	cruiser submarine	1,968	18 December 1931	Sunk 8 November 1942
Adua	Regia Marina	Adua	coastal submarine	843	14 November 1936	Sunk 30 September 1941
Agosta	French Navy	Redoutable	cruiser submarine	1,968	1 February 1937	Scuttled 18 June 1940
Ajax	French Navy	Redoutable	cruiser submarine	1,968	1 February 1934	Scuttled 24 September 1940
Alabastro	Regia Marina	Acciaio	coastal submarine	864	9 May 1942	Sunk 14 September 1942
Alagi	Regia Marina	Adua	coastal submarine	843	6 March 1937	Sold for scrap 1 February 1948
Alessandro Malaspina	Regia Marina	Marconi	submarine	1,490	20 June 1940	Missing after 7 September 1941
Alpino Bagnolini	Regia Marina	Liuzzi	submarine	1,484	22 December 1939	Seized by Germany September 1943; renamed UIT-22; sunk 11 March 1944
Amazone	French Navy; Free French Naval Forces	Diane	submarine	796	12 October 1933	Stricken 26 April 1946
Amberjack	United States Navy	Gato	fleet submarine	2,424	19 June 1942	Sunk 16 February 1943
Ambra	Regia Marina	Perla	coastal submarine	839	4 August 1936	Sunk 4 September 1944
Ametista	Regia Marina	Sirena	coastal submarine	837	1 April 1934	Scuttled 12 September 1943
Ammiraglio Cagni	Regia Marina	Cagni	submarine	2,136	1 April 1941	Stricken 1 February 1948
Ammiraglio Caracciolo	Regia Marina	Cagni	submarine	2,136	1 June 1941	Scuttled 11 December 1941
Ammiraglio Millo	Regia Marina	Cagni	submarine	2,136	1 May 1941	Sunk 14 March 1942
Ammiraglio Saint-Bon	Regia Marina	Cagni	submarine	2,136	12 June 1941	Sunk 5 January 1942
Amphion	Royal Navy	Amphion	submarine	1,590	27 March 1945	Sold for scrap 24 June 1971
Amphitrite	French Navy	Diane	submarine	796	8 June 1933	Sunk 8 November 1942
Anfitrite	Regia Marina	Sirena	coastal submarine	837	22 March 1934	Sunk 6 March 1941
Angler	United States Navy	Gato	fleet submarine	2,424	1 October 1943	Sold for scrap 1 February 1974
Antiope	French Navy; Free French Naval Forces	Diane	submarine	796	12 October 1933	Stricken 26 April 1946
Antonio Sciesa	Regia Marina	Balilla	cruiser submarine	1,874	12 April 1929	Scuttled 12 November 1942
Apogon	United States Navy	Balao	fleet submarine	2,391	16 July 1943	Sunk as target 25 July 1946
Aradam	Regia Marina	Adua	coastal submarine	843	16 January 1937	Scuttled September 1943; refloated by Germany; sunk 4 September 1944
Archerfish	United States Navy	Balao	fleet submarine	2,391	4 September 1943	Sunk as target 19 October 1968
Archimède	French Navy; Free French Naval Forces	Redoutable	cruiser submarine	1,968	22 December 1932	Scrapped February 1952
Archimede	Regia Marina	Brin	submarine	1,380	18 April 1939	Sunk 15 April 1943
Aréthuse	French Navy; Free French Naval Forces	Argonaute	submarine	785	14 July 1933	Joined the Free French Naval Forces December 1942; laid up 1944; sold for scrap 25 March 1946
Argento	Regia Marina	Acciaio	coastal submarine	864	16 May 1942	Scuttled 3 August 1943
Argo	French Navy; Free French Naval Forces	Redoutable	cruiser submarine	1,968	12 February 1933	Scrapped April 1946
Argo	Regia Marina	Argo	coastal submarine	1,000	31 August 1937	Scuttled 10 September 1943; refloated by Germany; scuttled 1 May 1945
Argonaut (SS-166)	United States Navy	V-4	submarine	4,161	2 April 1928	Sunk 10 January 1943
Argonaut (SS-475)	United States Navy	Tench	fleet submarine	2,414	15 January 1945	Sold to Canada as HMCS Rainbow 1968, scrapped 1977
Argonauta	Regia Marina	Argonauta	coastal submarine	1,080	1 January 1932	Sunk 28 June 1940
Argonaute	French Navy	Argonaute	submarine	785	1 June 1932	Sunk 8 November 1942
Ariane	French Navy	Ariane	submarine	787	1 September 1929	Scuttled 9 November 1942
Ascianghi	Regia Marina	Adua	coastal submarine	843	25 March 1938	Sunk 23 July 1943
Aspro	United States Navy	Balao	fleet submarine	2,391	31 July 1943	Sunk as target 16 November 1962
Asteria	Regia Marina	Acciaio	coastal submarine	864	8 November 1941	Scuttled 17 February 1943
Astute	Royal Navy	Amphion	submarine	1,590	30 June 1945	Sold for scrap 1 October 1970
Atalante	French Navy; Free French Naval Forces	Argonaute	submarine	785	18 September 1934	Joined the Free French Naval Forces December 1942; laid up 1944; sold for scrap 25 March 1946
Atropo	Regia Marina	Foca	minelayer submarine	1,625	14 February 1939	Stricken 23 March 1947
Atule	United States Navy	Balao	fleet submarine	2,391	21 June 1944	Transferred to Peru as Pacocha 31 July 1974; sunk in collision 26 August 1988
Aurore	French Navy	Aurore	coastal submarine	1,150	20 June 1940	Scuttled 27 November 1942
Avorio	Regia Marina	Acciaio	coastal submarine	864	25 March 1942	Scuttled 8 February 1943
Axum	Regia Marina	Adua	coastal submarine	843	2 December 1936	Wrecked and scuttled 28 December 1943
Balao	United States Navy	Balao	fleet submarine	2,391	4 February 1943	Sunk as target 6 September 1963
Balilla	Regia Marina	Balilla	cruiser submarine	1,874	21 July 1928	Decommissioned 28 April 1941, converted into barge, scrapped 1946
Bang	United States Navy	Balao	fleet submarine	2,391	4 December 1943	Transferred to Spain as Cosme Garcia, 1 October 1972; scrapped 1983
Barb	United States Navy	Gato	fleet submarine	2,424	2 April 1942	Sold to Italy as Enrico Tazzoli 13 December 1954, scrapped 1973
Barbarigo	Regia Marina	Marcello	submarine	1,313	19 September 1938	Missing after 16 June 1943
Barbel	United States Navy	Balao	fleet submarine	2,391	3 April 1944	Sunk 4 February 1945
Barbero	United States Navy	Balao	fleet submarine	2,391	29 April 1944	Sunk as target 7 October 1964
Barracuda	United States Navy	Barracuda	submarine	2,506	1 October 1924	Sold for scrap 16 November 1945
Bashaw	United States Navy	Gato	fleet submarine	2,424	25 October 1943	Sold for scrap 4 August 1972
Bass	United States Navy	Barracuda	submarine	2,506	26 September 1925	Scuttled 12 March 1945
Batfish	United States Navy	Balao	fleet submarine	2,391	21 August 1943	Museum ship 18 February 1972
Baya	United States Navy	Balao	fleet submarine	2,391	20 May 1944	Sold for scrap 12 October 1973
Becuna	United States Navy	Balao	fleet submarine	2,391	27 May 1944	Museum ship 21 June 1976
Beilul	Regia Marina	Adua	coastal submarine	843	14 September 1938	Captured by Germany 9 September 1943; Sunk May 1944
Bergall	United States Navy	Balao	fleet submarine	2,391	12 June 1944	Transferred to Turkey as Turgutreis 18 October 1958; scrapped April 2000
Berillo	Regia Marina	Perla	coastal submarine	846	5 August 1936	Scuttled 2 October 1940
Besugo	United States Navy	Balao	fleet submarine	2,391	19 June 1944	Transferred to Italy as Francesco Morosini 31 May 1966; sold for scrap, 20 June 1977
Bévéziers	French Navy	Redoutable	cruiser submarine	1,968	4 June 1937	Sunk 5 May 1942
Billfish	United States Navy	Balao	fleet submarine	2,391	20 April 1943	Sold for scrap 17 March 1971
Blackfin	United States Navy	Balao	fleet submarine	2,391	4 July 1944	Sunk as target 13 May 1973
Blackfish	United States Navy	Gato	fleet submarine	2,424	22 July 1942	Sold for scrap on 4 May 1959
Blenny	United States Navy	Balao	fleet submarine	2,391	27 June 1944	Scuttled 7 June 1989
Blower	United States Navy	Balao	fleet submarine	2,391	10 August 1944	Transferred to Turkey as Dumlupınar 16 November 1950; sunk in collision 4 April 1953
Blueback	United States Navy	Balao	fleet submarine	2,391	28 August 1944	Transferred to Turkey as İnönü 23 May 1948; returned to United States for scrapping 30 November 1973
Bluefish	United States Navy	Gato	fleet submarine	2,424	24 May 1943	Sold for scrap 8 June 1960
Bluegill	United States Navy	Gato	fleet submarine	2,424	11 November 1943	Scuttled 3 December 1970
Boarfish	United States Navy	Balao	fleet submarine	2,391	23 September 1944	Transferred to Turkey as Sakarya 23 May 1948; returned to United States for scrapping 1 January 1974
Bonefish	United States Navy	Gato	fleet submarine	2,424	31 May 1943	Sunk 18 June 1945
Bonita	United States Navy	Barracuda	submarine	2,506	22 May 1926	Sold for scrap 4 October 1945
Bowfin	United States Navy	Balao	fleet submarine	2,391	1 May 1943	Museum ship 1 August 1979
Bream	United States Navy	Gato	fleet submarine	2,424	24 January 1944	Sunk as target 7 November 1969
Brill	United States Navy	Balao	fleet submarine	2,391	26 October 1944	Transferred to Turkey as Birinci İnönü 25 May 1948; decommissioned 29 November 1972
Brin	Regia Marina	Brin	submarine	1,380	18 April 1939	Stricken 1 February 1948
Bronzo	Regia Marina	Acciaio	coastal submarine	864	2 January 1942	Captured by Royal Navy 12 July 1943; commissioned as HMS P714; transferred to France as Narval 29 January 1944; scrapped 1948
Bugara	United States Navy	Balao	fleet submarine	2,391	15 November 1944	Sank under tow 1 June 1971
Bullhead	United States Navy	Balao	fleet submarine	2,391	4 December 1944	Sunk 6 August 1945
Bumper	United States Navy	Balao	fleet submarine	2,391	9 December 1944	Transferred to Turkey as Çanakkale 16 November 1950; decommissioned 11 August 1976
Burrfish	United States Navy	Balao	fleet submarine	2,391	13 September 1943	Transferred to Canada as Grilse 11 May 1961; sunk as target 19 November 1969
CA 1	Regia Marina	CA (Series I)	midget submarine	16.1	15 April 1938	Scuttled 9 September 1943
CA 2	Regia Marina	CA (Series I)	midget submarine	16.1	late April 1938	Captured by Germany 9 September 1943; Scuttled August 1944
CA 3	Regia Marina	CA (Series II)	midget submarine		January 1943	Scuttled 9 September 1943
CA 4	Regia Marina	CA (Series II)	midget submarine		January 1943	Scuttled 9 September 1943
Cabezon	United States Navy	Balao	fleet submarine	2,391	30 December 1944	Sold for scrap 28 December 1971
Cabrilla	United States Navy	Balao	fleet submarine	2,391	24 May 1943	Museum ship 19 October 1968; sold for scrap 18 April 1972
Cachalot	United States Navy	Cachalot	submarine	1,650	1 December 1933	Sold for scrap 26 January 1947
Cachalot	Royal Navy	Grampus	minelayer submarine	2,157	15 August 1938	Sunk 30 July 1941
Caïman	French Navy	Requin	submarine	1,132	7 February 1928	Scuttled 27 November 1942; refloated February 1943; sunk 11 March 1944
Caiman	United States Navy	Balao	fleet submarine	2,391	17 July 1944	Transferred to Turkey as Dumlupınar 30 June 1972; retired 15 September 1986
Calypso	French Navy	Circé	submarine	764	29 January 1927	Disarmed December 1940; captured by Italy 8 December 1942; renamed FR117; scuttled 6 May 1943; refloated; stricken 18 August 1947
Capelin	United States Navy	Balao	fleet submarine	2,391	4 June 1943	Missing after 2 December 1943
Capitaine	United States Navy	Balao	fleet submarine	2,391	26 January 1945	Transferred to Italy 5 March 1966; retired 5 December 1977
Carbonero	United States Navy	Balao	fleet submarine	2,391	7 February 1945	Sunk as target 27 April 1975
Carp	United States Navy	Balao	fleet submarine	2,391	28 February 1945	Sold for scrap 26 July 1973
Casabianca	French Navy	Redoutable	cruiser submarine	1,968	1 January 1937	Scrapped February 1952
Catfish	United States Navy	Balao	fleet submarine	2,391	19 March 1945	Transferred to Argentina as Santa Fe 1 July 1971; scuttled 20 February 1985
Cavalla	United States Navy	Gato	fleet submarine	2,424	29 February 1944	Museum ship 21 January 1971
CB-1	Regia Marina	CB	midget submarine	44.3	27 January 1941	Transferred to Romania September 1943; Scuttled 25 August 1944; refloated by Soviet Union; commissioned in Soviet Navy as TM-4; scrapped 1945
CB-2	Regia Marina	CB	midget submarine	44.3	27 January 1941	Transferred to Romania September 1943; Scuttled August 1944; refloated by Soviet Union; commissioned in Soviet Navy as TM-5; scrapped 1945
CB-3	Regia Marina	CB	midget submarine	44.3	10 May 1941	Transferred to Romania September 1943; Scuttled 25 August 1944; refloated by Soviet Union; commissioned in Soviet Navy as TM-6; scrapped 1945
CB-4	Regia Marina	CB	midget submarine	44.3	10 May 1941	Transferred to Romania September 1943; Scuttled August 1944; refloated by Soviet Union; commissioned in Soviet Navy as TM-7; scrapped 1945
CB-5	Regia Marina	CB	midget submarine	44.3	10 May 1941	Sunk 13 June 1942
CB-6	Regia Marina	CB	midget submarine	44.3	10 May 1941	Transferred to Romania September 1943; Scuttled August 1944
CB-7	Regia Marina	CB	midget submarine	44.3	1 August 1943	Captured by Germany 9 September 1943; cannibalized for spare parts
CB-8	Regia Marina	CB	midget submarine	44.3	1 August 1943	Scrapped 1948
CB-9	Regia Marina	CB	midget submarine	44.3	1 August 1943	Scrapped 1948
CB-10	Regia Marina	CB	midget submarine	44.3	1 August 1943	Scrapped 1948
CB-11	Regia Marina	CB	midget submarine	44.3	24 August 1943	Scrapped 1948
CB-12	Regia Marina	CB	midget submarine	44.3	24 August 1943	Scrapped 1948
CB-13	National Republican Navy	CB	midget submarine	44.3	late 1943	Sunk 23 March 1945
CB-14	National Republican Navy	CB	midget submarine	44.3	late 1943	Sunk, possibly on 23 March 1945
CB-15	National Republican Navy	CB	midget submarine	44.3	late 1943	Destroyed in port 20 April 1944
CB-16	National Republican Navy	CB	midget submarine	44.3	late 1943	Beached after crew mutinied 2 October 1944; surrendered to United Kingdom
CB-17	National Republican Navy	CB	midget submarine	44.3	late 1943	Sunk 3 April 1945
CB-18	National Republican Navy	CB	midget submarine	44.3	late 1943	Sunk 31 March 1945
CB-19	National Republican Navy	CB	midget submarine	44.3	late 1943	Captured by the Yugoslav Partisans May 1945; scrapped 1947
CB-20	National Republican Navy	CB	midget submarine	44.3	late 1943	Captured by the Yugoslav Partisans May 1945; in service in Yugoslav Navy as Mališan during 1950s; museum ship 1959
CB-21	National Republican Navy	CB	midget submarine	44.3	late 1943	Sunk in collision 29 April 1945
CB-22	National Republican Navy	CB	midget submarine	44.3	late 1943	Sunk 11 March 1945
Cérès	French Navy	Minerve	submarine	856	15 July 1939	Scuttled 9 November 1942, salvaged 1943, stricken 18 February 1946
Cero	United States Navy	Gato	fleet submarine	2,424	4 July 1943	Sold for scrap October 1970
Charr	United States Navy	Balao	fleet submarine	2,391	23 September 1944	Sold for scrap 17 August 1972
Chivo	United States Navy	Balao	fleet submarine	2,391	28 April 1945	Transferred to Argentina as Santiago del Estero 1 July 1971; sold for scrap 1983
Chopper	United States Navy	Balao	fleet submarine	2,391	25 May 1945	Sank 21 July 1976
Chub	United States Navy	Balao	fleet submarine	2,391	21 October 1944	Transferred to Turkey as Gür 25 May 1948; decommissioned 12 December 1975; scrapped
Circé	French Navy	Circé	submarine	764	12 May 1928	Disarmed December 1940; captured by Italy 8 December 1942; sunk 31 January 1943
Ciro Menotti	Regia Marina	Bandiera	submarine	1,080	29 July 1930	Stricken 1 February 1948
Cisco	United States Navy	Balao	fleet submarine	2,391	10 May 1943	Sunk 28 September 1943
Clamagore	United States Navy	Balao	fleet submarine	2,391	28 June 1945	Museum ship May 1981
Clyde	Royal Navy	River	submarine	2,723	12 April 1935	Paid off 30 July 1946
Cobbler	United States Navy	Balao	fleet submarine	2,391	8 August 1945	Transferred to Turkey as Çanakkale 21 November 1973; decommissioned 22 January 1998
Cobia	United States Navy	Gato	fleet submarine	2,424	29 March 1944	Memorial ship 17 August 1970
Cobalto	Regia Marina	Acciaio	coastal submarine	864	18 March 1942	Sunk 12 August 1942
Cochino	United States Navy	Balao	fleet submarine	2,424	25 August 1945	Sank 26 August 1949
Cod	United States Navy	Gato	fleet submarine	2,424	21 June 1943	Museum ship 1 May 1976
Comandante Cappellini	Regia Marina	Marcello	submarine	1,313	23 September 1939	Seized by Japan and transferred to Germany as UIT-24 10 September 1943; seized by Japan 5 May 1945; commissioned as I-503 May 1945; surrendered to United States August 1945; scuttled 16 April 1946
Comandante Faà di Bruno	Regia Marina	Marcello	submarine	1,313	23 October 1939	Missing after 31 October 1940
Conger	United States Navy	Tench	fleet submarine	2,414	14 February 1945	Sold for scrap 9 July 1964
Console Generale Liuzzi	Regia Marina	Liuzzi	submarine	1,484	21 November 1939	Sunk 27 June 1940
Corallo	Regia Marina	Perla	coastal submarine	846	26 September 1936	Sunk 13 December 1942
Corvina	United States Navy	Gato	fleet submarine	2,424	6 August 1943	Sunk 16 November 1943
Crevalle	United States Navy	Balao	fleet submarine	2,391	21 April 1944	Sold for scrap 17 March 1971
Croaker	United States Navy	Gato	fleet submarine	2,424	24 June 1943	Museum ship 27 June 1976
Cutlass	United States Navy	Tench	fleet submarine	2,414	17 March 1945	Transferred to Republic of China as Hai Shih 15 April 1973
Curie	Royal Navy; Free French Naval Forces	U	submarine	740	2 May 1943	Formerly HMS Vox; loaned to Free French Naval Forces 2 May 1943; returned to United Kingdom July 1946; scrapped May 1949
Cuttlefish	United States Navy	Cachalot	submarine	1,650	8 June 1934	Sold for scrap 12 February 1947
Dace	United States Navy	Gato	fleet submarine	2,424	23 July 1943	Transferred to Italy as Leonardo da Vinci 31 January 1955; sold for scrap 1 April 1975
Dagabur	Regia Marina	Adua	coastal submarine	843	9 April 1937	Sunk 12 August 1942
Danaé	French Navy	Ariane	submarine	787		Scuttled 9 November 1942
Dandolo	Regia Marina	Marcello	submarine	1,313	25 March 1938	Stricken 1 February 1948
Darter	United States Navy	Gato	fleet submarine	2,424	7 September 1943	Wrecked 24 October 1944
Dauphin	French Navy	Requin	submarine	1,132	22 November 1927	Captured by Italy 8 December 1942; renamed FR 115; captured by Germany 9 September 1943; scuttled 15 September 1943
Dekabrist	Soviet Navy	Dekabrist	submarine	1,354	3 November 1928	Lost in training accident 13 November 1940
Delfin	Royal Hellenic Navy	V	submarine	740	16 October 1944	Formerly HMS Vengeful; loaned to Greece April 1945; returned to United Kingdom 1957; scrapped March 1958
Delfino	Regia Marina	Squalo	submarine	1,107	19 June 1931	Sunk in collision 23 March 1943
Delfinul	Royal Romanian Navy		submarine	900	1936	Captured by Soviet Union August 1944; returned 1951; scrapped 1957
Dentuda	United States Navy	Balao	fleet submarine	2,391	30 December 1944	Sold for scrap 12 February 1969
Des Geneys	Regia Marina	Pisani	submarine	1,040	31 October 1929	Decommissioned 16 April 1942; scrapped
Dessiè	Regia Marina	Adua	coastal submarine	843	14 April 1937	Sunk 28 November 1942
Devilfish	United States Navy	Balao	fleet submarine	2,391	1 September 1944	Sunk as a target 14 August 1968
Diablo	United States Navy	Tench	fleet submarine	2,414	31 March 1945	Transferred to Pakistan as Ghazi 1 June 1964; lost 4–5 December 1971
Diamant	French Navy	Saphir	minelayer submarine	925	21 June 1934	Scuttled 27 November 1942; refloated 29 March 1943; sunk 22 June 1944
Diamante	Regia Marina	Sirena	coastal submarine	837	18 November 1933	Sunk 20 June 1940
Diane	French Navy	Diane	submarine	796	1 September 1932	Scuttled 9 November 1942
Diaspro	Regia Marina	Perla	coastal submarine	846	22 August 1936	Stricken 1 February 1948
Dolfijn	Royal Netherlands Navy	U	submarine	730	8 October 1942	Scrapped 1952
Dolphin	United States Navy	V-7	submarine	2,240	1 June 1932	Sold for scrap 26 August 1946
Domenico Millelire	Regia Marina	Balilla	cruiser submarine	1,874	11 August 1928	Decommissioned 1 April 1943, purchased by Pirelli and transformed into latex storage 1948, scrapped 1977
Dorado	United States Navy	Gato	fleet submarine	2,424	28 August 1943	Sunk 12 October 1943
Doris (Q135)	French Navy	Circé	submarine	764	26 May 1928	Sunk 8 May 1940
Doris (P84)	Free French Naval Forces	V	submarine	740	1 August 1944	Formerly HMS Vineyard; returned to the United Kingdom 18 November 1947; scrapped June 1950
Dragonet	United States Navy	Balao	fleet submarine	2,391	6 March 1944	Scuttled 17 September 1961
Drum	United States Navy	Gato	fleet submarine	2,424	1 November 1941	Museum ship 14 April 1969
Durbo	Regia Marina	Adua	coastal submarine	843	1 July 1938	Scuttled 18 October 1940
Dzik	Polish Navy	U	submarine	730	16 December 1942	Transferred to Denmark as U 1 July 1947; scrapped 1958
Emo	Regia Marina	Marcello	submarine	1,313	25 October 1938	Scuttled 10 November 1942
Enrico Tazzoli	Regia Marina	Calvi	cruiser submarine	2,028	18 May 1936	Missing after 17 May 1943
Enrico Toti	Regia Marina	Balilla	cruiser submarine	1,874	19 September 1928	Decommissioned 1 April 1943, converted into blockship, scrapped 1946
Entemedor	United States Navy	Balao	fleet submarine	2,391	6 April 1945	Transferred to Turkey as Preveze on 31 July 1972; discarded 1987
Escolar	United States Navy	Balao	fleet submarine	2,391	2 June 1944	Missing after 17 October 1944
Espadon	French Navy	Requin	submarine	1,132	16 December 1927	Captured by Italy 8 December 1942; renamed FR 114; scuttled 15 September 1943; refloated; not repaired
Ettore Fieramosca	Regia Marina	Balilla	cruiser submarine	2,094	1930	Decommissioned April 1941
Eurydice	French Navy	Ariane	submarine	787	1 September 1929	Scuttled 27 November 1942
Filippo Corridoni	Regia Marina	Bragadin	submarine	981	17 November 1931	Stricken 1 February 1948
Finback	United States Navy	Gato	fleet submarine	2,424	31 January 1942	Sold for scrap 15 July 1959
Fisalia	Regia Marina	Argonauta	coastal submarine	1,080	5 June 1932	Sunk 28 September 1941
Flasher	United States Navy	Gato	fleet submarine	2,424	25 September 1943	Sold for scrap 8 June 1963
Flier	United States Navy	Gato	fleet submarine	2,424	18 October 1943	Sunk 13 August 1944
Flounder	United States Navy	Gato	fleet submarine	2,424	29 November 1943	Scrapped February 1960
Flutto	Regia Marina	Flutto	submarine	1,093	20 March 1943	Sunk 11 July 1943
Flying Fish	United States Navy	Gato	fleet submarine	2,424	10 December 1941	Sold for scrap 1 May 1959
Foca	Regia Marina	Foca	minelayer submarine	1,625	6 November 1937	Sunk 13 October 1940
FR 111	Regia Marina	Requin	submarine	1,132	7 May 1928	Former French submarine Phoque; captured 8 December 1942; sunk 28 February 1943
FR 112	Regia Marina	Saphir	minelayer submarine	925	30 September 1930	Former French submarine Saphir; captured 8 December 1942; captured bv Germany and scuttled 15 September 1943
FR 113	Regia Marina	Requin	submarine	1,132	28 May 1926	Former French submarine Requin; captured 8 December 1942; captured by Germany 9 September 1943; sold for scrap 1944
FR 114	Regia Marina	Requin	submarine	1,132	16 December 1927	Former French submarine Espadon; captured 8 December 1942; scuttled 15 September 1943; refloated; not repaired
FR 115	Regia Marina	Requin	submarine	1,132	22 November 1927	Former French submarine Dauphin; captured 8 December 1942; captured by Germany 9 September 1943; scuttled 15 September 1943
FR 116	Regia Marina	Saphir	minelayer submarine	925	10 September 1930	Former French submarine Turquoise; captured 8 December 1942; captured bv Germany and scuttled 8 September 1943
FR 117	Regia Marina	Circé	submarine	764	29 January 1927	Former French submarine Calypso; captured 8 December 1942; scuttled 6 May 1943; refloated; stricken 18 August 1947
Fratelli Bandiera	Regia Marina	Bandiera	submarine	1,080	2 June 1930	Stricken 1 February 1948
Fresia	Chilean Navy	H	submarine	434	1917	Scrapped 1945
Fresnel	French Navy	Redoutable	cruiser submarine	1,968	22 February 1932	Scuttled 27 November 1942; refloated 28 January 1943; sunk 11 March 1944
Gabilan	United States Navy	Gato	fleet submarine	2,424	28 December 1943	Sold for scrap 11 January 1960
Galatea	Regia Marina	Sirena	coastal submarine	837	25 June 1934	Stricken 1 February 1948
Galatée	French Navy	Sirène	submarine	745	1927	Scuttled 27 November 1942
Galileo Galilei	Regia Marina; Royal Navy	Archimede	submarine	1,239	19 March 1934	Captured by United Kingdom 18 June 1940, commissioned as HMS X2 June 1942, paid off January 1946
Galileo Ferraris	Regia Marina	Archimede	submarine	1,239	31 January 1935	Sunk 25 October 1941
Galvani	Regia Marina	Brin	submarine	1,380	29 July 1938	Sunk 26 June 1940
Gar	United States Navy	Tambor	fleet submarine	2,370	14 April 1941	Sold for scrap 11 December 1959
Gato	United States Navy	Gato	fleet submarine	2,424	31 December 1941	Sold for scrap 25 July 1960
Gemma	Regia Marina	Perla	coastal submarine	846	8 July 1936	Sunk 8 October 1940
General Mola	Spanish Navy	Archimede	submarine	1,239	1935	Stricken 1959
General Sanjurjo	Spanish Navy	Archimede	submarine	1,239	1934	Stricken 1959
Giada	Regia Marina	Acciaio	coastal submarine	864	6 December 1941	Stricken 1 January 1966
Giovanni Bausan	Regia Marina	Pisani	submarine	1,040	15 September 1929	Decommissioned 16 April 1942; scrapped
Giovanni da Procida	Regia Marina	Mameli	submarine	993	20 January 1929	Decommissioned 16 April 1942; scrapped
Giuseppe Finzi	Regia Marina	Calvi	cruiser submarine	2,028	8 January 1936	Captured by Germany 9 September 1943; renamed UIT-21; scuttled 25 August 1944
Glauco	Regia Marina	Glauco	submarine	1,305	January 1936	Scuttled 27 June 1941
Goffredo Mameli	Regia Marina	Mameli	submarine	993	20 January 1929	Stricken 1 February 1948
Golet	United States Navy	Gato	fleet submarine	2,424	30 November 1943	Sunk 14 June 1944
Gondar	Regia Marina	Adua	coastal submarine	843	28 February 1938	Scuttled 30 September 1940
Gorgo	Regia Marina	Flutto	submarine	1,093	11 November 1942	Sunk 21 May 1943
Grampus	Royal Navy	Grampus	submarine	2,157	10 March 1937	Sunk 16 June 1940
Grampus	United States Navy	Tambor	fleet submarine	2,370	23 May 1941	Sunk 5 March 1943
Granito	Regia Marina	Acciaio	coastal submarine	864	3 January 1942	Sunk 9 November 1942
Graph	Royal Navy	Type VIIC	submarine	857	15 May 1941	Former German U-570, captured by United Kingdom 27 August 1941, wrecked September 1944
Grayback	United States Navy	Tambor	fleet submarine	2,370	30 June 1941	Sunk 27 February 1944
Grayling	United States Navy	Tambor	fleet submarine	2,370	1 March 1941	Sunk between 9 and 12 September 1943
Greenling	United States Navy	Gato	fleet submarine	2,424	21 January 1942	Sold for scrap 21 June 1960
Grenadier	United States Navy	Tambor	fleet submarine	2,370	1 May 1941	Scuttled 22 April 1943
Grouper	United States Navy	Gato	fleet submarine	2,424	12 February 1942	Sold for scrap 11 August 1970
Growler	United States Navy	Gato	fleet submarine	2,424	20 March 1942	Sunk 8 November 1944
Grunion	United States Navy	Gato	fleet submarine	2,424	11 April 1942	Sunk ca. 30 July 1942
Guacolda	Chilean Navy	H	submarine	434	1917	Scrapped 1949
Guale	Chilean Navy	H	submarine	434	1917	Scrapped 1945
Guardfish	United States Navy	Gato	fleet submarine	2,424	8 May 1942	Sunk as target 10 October 1961
Guavina	United States Navy	Gato	fleet submarine	2,424	23 December 1943	Sunk as target 14 November 1967
Guglielmo Marconi	Regia Marina	Marconi	submarine	1,490	2 February 1940	Missing after 28 October 1941
Guglielmotti	Regia Marina	Brin	submarine	1,380	12 October 1938	Sunk 17 March 1942
Guitarro	United States Navy	Gato	fleet submarine	2,424	26 January 1944	Sold for scrap December 1959
Gunnel	United States Navy	Gato	fleet submarine	2,424	20 August 1942	Transferred to Turkey as Preveze 7 August 1954; scrapped September 1983
Gür	Turkish Navy		submarine	968	29 December 1936	Decommissioned 1947
Gurnard	United States Navy	Gato	fleet submarine	2,424	18 September 1942	Sold for scrap 29 October 1961
H1	Regia Marina	H	submarine	520	23 December 1916	Stricken 23 March 1947
H2	Regia Marina	H	submarine	520	15 December 1916	Stricken 23 March 1947
H4	Regia Marina	H	submarine	520	15 May 1917	Stricken 23 March 1947
H6	Regia Marina	H	submarine	520	23 July 1917	Scuttled 1 September 1943
H8	Regia Marina	H	submarine	520	27 June 1918	Sunk 5 June 1943
H28	Royal Navy	H	submarine	510	29 June 1918	Scrapped 18 August 1944
H31	Royal Navy	H	submarine	510	21 February 1919	Sunk 24 December 1941
H32	Royal Navy	H	submarine	510	14 May 1919	Scrapped 18 October 1944
H33	Royal Navy	H	submarine	510	17 May 1919	Scrapped 19 May 1944
H34	Royal Navy	H	submarine	510	10 September 1919	Scrapped July 1945
H43	Royal Navy	H	submarine	510	25 November 1919	Scrapped November 1944
H44	Royal Navy	H	submarine	510	15 April 1920	Scrapped February 1945
H49	Royal Navy	H	submarine	510	25 October 1919	Sunk 18 October 1940
H50	Royal Navy	H	submarine	510	3 February 1920	Scrapped July 1945
Ha-101	Imperial Japanese Navy	Ha-101	transport submarine	493	22 November 1944	Scrapped or scuttled October 1945
Ha-102	Imperial Japanese Navy	Ha-101	transport submarine	493	6 December 1944	Scrapped or scuttled October 1945
Ha-103	Imperial Japanese Navy	Ha-101	transport submarine	493	3 February 1945	Scuttled 1 April 1946
Ha-104	Imperial Japanese Navy	Ha-101	transport submarine	493	1 December 1944	Scuttled October 1945
Ha-105	Imperial Japanese Navy	Ha-101	transport submarine	493	19 February 1945	Scuttled 1 April 1946
Ha-106	Imperial Japanese Navy	Ha-101	transport submarine	493	15 December 1944	Scuttled 1 April 1946
Ha-107	Imperial Japanese Navy	Ha-101	transport submarine	493	7 February 1945	Scuttled 1 April 1946
Ha-108	Imperial Japanese Navy	Ha-101	transport submarine	493	6 May 1945	Scuttled 1 April 1946
Ha-109	Imperial Japanese Navy	Ha-101	transport submarine	493	10 March 1945	Scuttled 1 April 1946
Ha-111	Imperial Japanese Navy	Ha-101	transport submarine	493	13 July 1945	Scuttled 1 April 1946
Ha-201	Imperial Japanese Navy	Ha-201	submarine	440	31 May 1945	Scuttled 1 April 1946
Ha-202	Imperial Japanese Navy	Ha-201	submarine	440	31 May 1945	Scuttled 1 April 1946
Ha-203	Imperial Japanese Navy	Ha-201	submarine	440	20 June 1945	Scuttled 1 April 1946
Ha-204	Imperial Japanese Navy	Ha-201	submarine	440	25 June 1945	Wrecked 29 October 1945
Ha-205	Imperial Japanese Navy	Ha-201	submarine	440	3 July 1945	Scuttled 9 May 1946
Ha-207	Imperial Japanese Navy	Ha-201	submarine	440	14 August 1945	Scuttled 5 April 1946
Ha-208	Imperial Japanese Navy	Ha-201	submarine	440	4 August 1945	Scuttled 1 April 1946
Ha-209	Imperial Japanese Navy	Ha-201	submarine	440	4 August 1945	Wrecked 18 August 1945
Ha-210	Imperial Japanese Navy	Ha-201	submarine	440	11 August 1945	Scuttled 5 April 1946
Ha-216	Imperial Japanese Navy	Ha-201	submarine	440	16 August 1945	Scuttled 5 April 1946
Hackleback	United States Navy	Balao	fleet submarine	2,391	7 November 1944	Sold for scrap 4 December 1968
Haddo	United States Navy	Gato	fleet submarine	2,424	9 October 1942	Sold for scrap 4 May 1959
Haddock	United States Navy	Gato	fleet submarine	2,424	14 March 1942	Sold for scrap 23 August 1960
Hake	United States Navy	Gato	fleet submarine	2,424	30 October 1942	Sold for scrap 5 December 1972
Halibut	United States Navy	Gato	fleet submarine	2,424	10 April 1942	Sold for scrap 9 December 1946
Hammerhead	United States Navy	Gato	fleet submarine	2,424	1 March 1944	Transferred to Turkey as Cerbe 23 October 1954; decommissioned 4 May 1972; scrapped
Harder	United States Navy	Gato	fleet submarine	2,424	2 December 1942	Sunk 24 August 1944
Hardhead	United States Navy	Balao	fleet submarine	2,391	18 April 1944	Transferred to Greece as Papanikolis 26 July 1972; sold for scrap 1993
Hawkbill	United States Navy	Balao	fleet submarine	2,391	17 May 1944	Transferred to the Netherlands as Zeeleeuw 21 April 1953; sold for scrap, 24 November 1970
Henri Poincaré	French Navy	Redoutable	cruiser submarine	1,968	23 December 1931	Scuttled 27 November 1942; refloated; scrapped September 1943
Herring	United States Navy	Gato	fleet submarine	2,424	4 May 1942	Sunk 1 June 1944
Hoe	United States Navy	Gato	fleet submarine	2,424	16 December 1942	Sold for scrap 10 September 1960
Hrabri	Royal Yugoslav Navy; Regia Marina	Hrabri	submarine	1,164	1927	Captured and scrapped by the Italians in 1941
Humaytá	Brazilian Navy	Balilla (Modified)	cruiser submarine	1,884	20 July 1929	Decommissioned 25 November 1950
I-1	Imperial Japanese Navy	Type J1	cruiser submarine	2,791	10 March 1926	Wrecked 29 January 1943
I-2	Imperial Japanese Navy	Type J1	cruiser submarine	2,791	24 July 1926	Sunk 7 April 1944
I-3	Imperial Japanese Navy	Type J1	cruiser submarine	2,791	30 November 1926	Sunk 9 December 1942
I-4	Imperial Japanese Navy	Type J1	cruiser submarine	2,791	24 December 1929	Sunk 21 December 1942
I-5	Imperial Japanese Navy	Type J1 Modified	submarine aircraft carrier	2,921	31 July 1932	Sunk 19 July 1944
I-6	Imperial Japanese Navy	Type J2	submarine aircraft carrier	2,921	15 May 1935	Sunk 16 June 1944
I-7	Imperial Japanese Navy	Type J3	submarine aircraft carrier	3,583	31 March 1937	Wrecked 22 June 1943
I-8	Imperial Japanese Navy	Type J3	submarine aircraft carrier	3,583	5 December 1938	Sunk 31 March 1945
I-9	Imperial Japanese Navy	Type A1	submarine aircraft carrier	4,129	13 February 1941	Sunk 13 June 1943
I-10	Imperial Japanese Navy	Type A1	submarine aircraft carrier	4,129	31 October 1941	Sunk 4 July 1944
I-11	Imperial Japanese Navy	Type A1	submarine aircraft carrier	4,129	16 May 1942	Missing after 11 January 1944
I-12	Imperial Japanese Navy	Type A2	submarine	4,150	25 May 1944	Sunk 13 November 1944
I-13	Imperial Japanese Navy	Type A3	submarine aircraft carrier	4,762	16 December 1944	Sunk 16 July 1945
I-14	Imperial Japanese Navy	Type A3	submarine aircraft carrier	4,762	14 March 1945	Sunk as target 28 May 1946
I-15	Imperial Japanese Navy	Type B1	submarine aircraft carrier	3,654	30 September 1940	Sunk 10 November 1942
I-16	Imperial Japanese Navy	Type C1	midget submarine-carrying submarine	3,561	30 March 1940	Sunk 19 May 1944
I-17	Imperial Japanese Navy	Type B1	submarine aircraft carrier	3,654	24 January 1941	Sunk 19 August 1943
I-18	Imperial Japanese Navy	Type C1	midget submarine-carrying submarine	3,561	31 January 1941	Sunk 11 February 1943
I-19	Imperial Japanese Navy	Type B1	submarine aircraft carrier	3,654	28 April 1941	Sunk 25 November 1943
I-20	Imperial Japanese Navy	Type C1	midget submarine-carrying submarine	3,561	26 September 1940	Missing after 31 August 1943
I-21	Imperial Japanese Navy	Type B1	submarine aircraft carrier	3,654	15 July 1941	Sunk 29 November 1943
I-22	Imperial Japanese Navy	Type C1	midget submarine-carrying submarine	3,561	10 March 1941	Sunk 6 October 1942
I-23	Imperial Japanese Navy	Type B1	submarine aircraft carrier	3,654	27 September 1941	Missing after 24 February 1942
I-24	Imperial Japanese Navy	Type C1	midget submarine-carrying submarine	3,561	31 October 1941	Sunk 1 June 1943
I-25	Imperial Japanese Navy	Type B1	submarine aircraft carrier	3,654	15 October 1941	Sunk 3 September 1943
I-26	Imperial Japanese Navy	Type B1	submarine aircraft carrier	3,654	6 November 1941	Sunk 26 October 1944
I-27	Imperial Japanese Navy	Type B1	submarine aircraft carrier	3,654	24 February 1942	Sunk 12 February 1944
I-28	Imperial Japanese Navy	Type B1	submarine aircraft carrier	3,654	6 February 1942	Sunk 17 May 1942
I-29	Imperial Japanese Navy	Type B1	submarine aircraft carrier	3,654	27 February 1942	Sunk 26 July 1944
I-30	Imperial Japanese Navy	Type B1	submarine aircraft carrier	3,654	28 February 1942	Sunk 13 October 1942
I-31	Imperial Japanese Navy	Type B1	submarine aircraft carrier	3,654	30 May 1942	Sunk 13 May 1943
I-32	Imperial Japanese Navy	Type B1	submarine aircraft carrier	3,654	26 April 1942	Sunk 24 March 1944
I-33	Imperial Japanese Navy	Type B1	submarine aircraft carrier	3,654	26 April 1942	Sank in diving accident 13 June 1944
I-34	Imperial Japanese Navy	Type B1	submarine aircraft carrier	3,654	31 August 1942	Sunk 13 November 1943
I-35	Imperial Japanese Navy	Type B1	submarine aircraft carrier	3,654	31 August 1942	Sunk 23 November 1943
I-36	Imperial Japanese Navy	Type B1	submarine aircraft carrier	3,654	30 September 1942	Scuttled 1 April 1946
I-37	Imperial Japanese Navy	Type B1	submarine aircraft carrier	3,654	10 March 1943	Sunk 19 November 1944
I-38	Imperial Japanese Navy	Type B1	submarine aircraft carrier	3,654	31 January 1943	Sunk 13 November 1944
I-39	Imperial Japanese Navy	Type B1	submarine aircraft carrier	3,654	22 April 1943	Missing after 25 November 1943
I-40	Imperial Japanese Navy	Type B2	submarine	3,700	31 July 1943	Missing after 22 November 1943
I-41	Imperial Japanese Navy	Type B2	submarine	3,700	18 September 1943	Sunk 18 November 1944
I-42	Imperial Japanese Navy	Type B2	submarine	3,700	3 November 1943	Sunk 23 March 1944
I-43	Imperial Japanese Navy	Type B2	submarine	3,700	5 November 1943	Sunk 15 February 1944
I-44	Imperial Japanese Navy	Type B2	submarine	3,700	31 January 1944	Missing April 1945
I-45	Imperial Japanese Navy	Type B2	submarine	3,700	28 December 1943	Sunk 29 October 1944
I-46	Imperial Japanese Navy	Type C2	submarine	3,621	29 February 1944	Missing October 1944
I-47	Imperial Japanese Navy	Type C2	submarine	3,621	10 July 1944	Scuttled 1 April 1946
I-48	Imperial Japanese Navy	Type C2	submarine	3,621	5 September 1944	Sunk 23 January 1945
I-52	Imperial Japanese Navy	Type C3	transport submarine	3,644	28 December 1943	Sunk 24 June 1944
I-53	Imperial Japanese Navy	Type C3	submarine	3,644	20 February 1944	Scuttled 1 April 1946
I-54	Imperial Japanese Navy	Type B3	submarine aircraft carrier	3,747	31 March 1944	Missing after 23 October 1944
I-55	Imperial Japanese Navy	Type C3	transport submarine	3,644	20 April 1944	Missing after 13 July 1944
I-56	Imperial Japanese Navy	Type B3	submarine aircraft carrier	3,747	8 June 1944	Missing April 1945
I-58	Imperial Japanese Navy	Type B3	submarine aircraft carrier	3,747	7 September 1944	Scuttled 1 April 1946
I-60	Imperial Japanese Navy	KD3 type	cruiser submarine	2,300	24 December 1929	Sunk 17 January 1942
I-64	Imperial Japanese Navy	KD4 type	cruiser submarine	2,300	30 August 1930	Sunk 17 May 1942
I-70	Imperial Japanese Navy	KD6 type	cruiser submarine	2,440	9 November 1935	Sunk 10 December 1941
I-73	Imperial Japanese Navy	KD6 type	cruiser submarine	2,440	7 January 1937	Sunk 27 January 1942
I-121 (ex-I-21)	Imperial Japanese Navy	Kiraisen type	minelayer submarine	1,768	31 March 1927	Scuttled 30 April 1946
I-122 (ex-I-22)	Imperial Japanese Navy	Kiraisen type	minelayer submarine	1,768	28 October 1928	Sunk 10 June 1945
I-123 (ex-I-23)	Imperial Japanese Navy	Kiraisen type	minelayer submarine	1,768	28 April 1928	Sunk 29 August 1942
I-124 (ex-I-24)	Imperial Japanese Navy	Kiraisen type	minelayer submarine	1,768	10 December 1928	Sunk 20 January 1942
I-152 (ex-I-52)	Imperial Japanese Navy	KD2 type	training submarine	2,500	1 November 1924	Scrapped 1946–1948
I-153 (ex-I-53)	Imperial Japanese Navy	KD3A type	submarine	2,300	30 March 1927	Scuttled May 1946
I-154 (ex-I-54)	Imperial Japanese Navy	KD3A type	submarine	2,300	15 December 1927	Scuttled May 1946
I-155 (ex-I-55)	Imperial Japanese Navy	KD3A type	submarine	2,300	5 September 1927	Scuttled 8 May 1946
I-156 (ex-I-56)	Imperial Japanese Navy	KD3B type	submarine	2,300	31 March 1929	Scuttled 1 April 1946
I-157 (ex-I-57)	Imperial Japanese Navy	KD3B type	submarine	2,300	15 May 1928	Scuttled 1 April 1946
I-158 (ex-I-58)	Imperial Japanese Navy	KD3A type	submarine	2,300	24 December 1929	Scuttled 1 April 1946
I-159 (ex-I-59)	Imperial Japanese Navy	KD3B type	submarine	2,300	31 March 1930	Scuttled 1 April 1946
I-162 (ex-I-62)	Imperial Japanese Navy	KD4 type	submarine	2,300	24 April 1930	Scuttled 1 April 1946
I-165 (ex-I-65)	Imperial Japanese Navy	KD5 type	submarine	2,330	1 December 1932	Sunk 27 June 1945
I-166 (ex-I-66)	Imperial Japanese Navy	KD5 type	submarine	2,330	10 November 1932	Sunk 17 July 1944
I-168 (ex-I-68)	Imperial Japanese Navy	KD6 type	cruiser submarine	2,440	31 July 1934	Sunk 27 July 1943
I-169 (ex-I-69)	Imperial Japanese Navy	KD6 type	cruiser submarine	2,440	28 September 1935	Sank in diving accident 4 April 1944
I-171 (ex-I-71)	Imperial Japanese Navy	KD6 type	cruiser submarine	2,440	24 December 1935	Sunk 1 February 1944
I-172 (ex-I-72)	Imperial Japanese Navy	KD6 type	cruiser submarine	2,440	7 January 1937	Sunk October–November 1942
I-174 (ex-I-74)	Imperial Japanese Navy	KD6 type	cruiser submarine	2,440	15 August 1938	Sunk 12 April 1944
I-175 (ex-I-75)	Imperial Japanese Navy	KD6 type	cruiser submarine	2,440	8 December 1938	Sunk 4 February 1944
I-176	Imperial Japanese Navy	KD7 type	cruiser submarine	2,602	4 August 1942	Sunk 16 May 1944
I-177	Imperial Japanese Navy	KD7 type	cruiser submarine	2,602	28 December 1942	Sunk 3 October 1944
I-178	Imperial Japanese Navy	KD7 type	cruiser submarine	2,602	26 December 1942	Missing June 1943
I-179	Imperial Japanese Navy	KD7 type	cruiser submarine	2,602	18 June 1943	Sank 14 July 1944
I-180	Imperial Japanese Navy	KD7 type	cruiser submarine	2,602	15 January 1943	Sunk 27 April 1944
I-181	Imperial Japanese Navy	KD7 type	cruiser submarine	2,602	24 May 1943	Wrecked 16 January 1944
I-182	Imperial Japanese Navy	KD7 type	cruiser submarine	2,602	10 May 1943	Sunk 1 September 1944
I-183	Imperial Japanese Navy	KD7 type	cruiser submarine	2,602	3 October 1943	Sunk 29 April 1944
I-184	Imperial Japanese Navy	KD7 type	cruiser submarine	2,602	15 October 1943	Sunk 19 June 1944
I-185	Imperial Japanese Navy	KD7 type	cruiser submarine	2,602	23 September 1943	Sunk 22 June 1944
I-201	Imperial Japanese Navy	Sentaka type	submarine	1,479	2 February 1945	Sunk as target 23 May 1946
I-202	Imperial Japanese Navy	Sentaka type	submarine	1,479	12 February 1945	Scuttled 5 April 1946
I-203	Imperial Japanese Navy	Sentaka type	submarine	1,479	29 May 1945	Sunk as target 21 May 1946
I-351	Imperial Japanese Navy	Senho type	submarine tanker	4,290	28 January 1945	Sunk 14 July 1945
I-361	Imperial Japanese Navy	Type D1	transport submarine/kaiten carrier	2,215	25 May 1944	Sunk 31 May 1945
I-362	Imperial Japanese Navy	Type D1	transport submarine	2,215	23 May 1944	Sunk 14 January 1945
I-363	Imperial Japanese Navy	Type D1	transport submarine/kaiten carrier	2,215	8 July 1944	Sunk 29 October 1945
I-364	Imperial Japanese Navy	Type D1	transport submarine	2,215	14 June 1944	Sunk 16 September 1944
I-365	Imperial Japanese Navy	Type D1	transport submarine	2,215	1 August 1944	Sunk 29 November 1944
I-366	Imperial Japanese Navy	Type D1	transport submarine/kaiten carrier	2,215	15 August 1944	Scuttled 1 April 1946
I-367	Imperial Japanese Navy	Type D1	transport submarine/kaiten carrier	2,215	3 August 1944	Scuttled 1 April 1946
I-368	Imperial Japanese Navy	Type D1	transport submarine/kaiten carrier	2,215	25 August 1944	Sunk 26 February 1945
I-369	Imperial Japanese Navy	Type D1	transport submarine	2,215	9 October 1944	Scrapped 1946
I-370	Imperial Japanese Navy	Type D1	transport submarine/kaiten carrier	2,215	4 September 1944	Sunk 26 February 1945
I-371	Imperial Japanese Navy	Type D1	transport submarine	2,215	2 October 1944	Missing February 1945
I-372	Imperial Japanese Navy	Type D1	transport submarine	2,215	8 November 1944	Sunk 18 July 1945
I-373	Imperial Japanese Navy	Type D2	transport/tanker submarine	2,240	14 April 1945	Sunk 14 August 1945
I-400	Imperial Japanese Navy	Sentoku type	submarine aircraft carrier	6,560	30 December 1944	Sunk as target 4 June 1946
I-401	Imperial Japanese Navy	Sentoku type	submarine aircraft carrier	6,560	8 January 1945	Sunk as target 31 May 1946
I-402	Imperial Japanese Navy	Sentoku type	submarine tanker	6,560	24 July 1945	Scuttled 1 April 1946
I-501 (ex-U-181)	Imperial Japanese Navy	Type IXD2	submarine	1,771	16 July 1945	Scuttled 12 February 1946
I-502 (ex-U-862)	Imperial Japanese Navy	Type IXD2	submarine	1,771	15 July 1945	Scuttled 13 February 1946
I-503	Imperial Japanese Navy	Marcello	submarine	1,313	10 May 1945	Former Italian submarine Comandante Cappellini and German UIT-24; scuttled 16 April 1946
I-504	Imperial Japanese Navy	Marconi	submarine	1,400	10 May 1945	Former Italian submarine Luigi Torelli and German UIT-25; scuttled 16 April 1946
I-505 (ex-U-219)	Imperial Japanese Navy	Type XB	minelayer submarine	2,143	15 July 1945	Scuttled 3 February 1946
I-506 (ex-U-195)	Imperial Japanese Navy	Type IXD1	submarine	1,771	15 July 1945	Scuttled 15 February 1946
Icefish	United States Navy	Balao	fleet submarine	2,391	10 June 1944	Transferred to the Netherlands as Walrus 21 February 1953; sold for scrap 15 August 1971
Iku-Turso	Finnish Navy	Vetehinen	submarine	705	13 October 1931	Decommissioned 1946, scrapped 1950s
Irex	United States Navy	Tench	fleet submarine	2,414	14 May 1945	Sold for scrap 13 September 1971
Iride	Regia Marina	Perla	coastal submarine	839	6 November 1936	Sunk 22 August 1940
Iris	French Navy	Minerve	submarine	856	15 September 1936	Decommissioned 1 February 1950
Jack	United States Navy	Gato	fleet submarine	2,424	6 January 1943	Transferred to Greece as Amfitriti 21 April 1958; sunk as target 5 September 1967
Jalea	Regia Marina	Argonauta	coastal submarine	1,080	16 March 1933	Stricken 1 February 1948
Jallao	United States Navy	Balao	fleet submarine	2,391	8 July 1944	Transferred to Spain as Narciso Monturiol 26 June 1974; scuttled 1985
Jantina	Regia Marina	Argonauta	coastal submarine	1,080	1 March 1933	Sunk 5 July 1941
Jastrząb	Polish Navy	S (Group I)	submarine	1,062	9 July 1923	Former USS S-25, transferred to United Kingdom as HMS P551 4 November 1941; loaned to Polish government-in-exile 4 November 1941; sunk 2 May 1942
Junon	French Navy; Free French Naval Forces	Minerve	submarine	856	20 September 1937	Decommissioned 6 December 1954, scrapped 1960
K VII	Royal Netherlands Navy	K V	submarine	649	5 September 1922	Destroyed in a Japanese bombing on 18 February 1942
K VIII	Royal Netherlands Navy	K VIII	submarine	810	15 September 1922	Stripped and abandoned in 1943 due lack of crew and age
K IX	Royal Netherlands Navy; Royal Australian Navy	K VIII	submarine	810	21 June 1923	Transferred to RAN as HMAS K9 on 22 June 1943
K X	Royal Netherlands Navy	K VIII	submarine	810	24 September 1923	Scuttled on 2 March 1942 at Surabaya to avoid being captured by the Japanese
K XI	Royal Netherlands Navy	K XI	submarine	828	24 March 1925	Stripped and scuttled 1945 / 1946
K XII	Royal Netherlands Navy	K XI	submarine	828	19 May 1925	Sold in 1946 and scrapped in 1951
K XIII	Royal Netherlands Navy	K XI	submarine	828	29 March 1926	Scuttled on 2 March 1942 to prevent being captured by the Japanese
K XIV	Royal Netherlands Navy	K XIV	submarine	1,045	6 July 1933	Decommissioned 23 April 1946, stricken 1 June 1946
K XV	Royal Netherlands Navy	K XIV	submarine	1,045	30 December 1933	Stricken 1 June 1946, sold for scrap December 1950
K XVI	Royal Netherlands Navy	K XIV	submarine	1,045	31 January 1934	Sunk on 25 December 1941 by a torpedo of the I-166
K XVII	Royal Netherlands Navy	K XIV	submarine	1,045	19 December 1933	Struck and sunk by a Japanese mine on 21 December 1941
K XVIII	Royal Netherlands Navy	K XIV	submarine	1,045	23 March 1934	Scuttled on 2 March 1942 in order to prevent Japanese capture
Kalev	Estonian Navy; Soviet Navy	Kalev	minelayer submarine	853	12 March 1937	Captured by Soviet Union 18 September 1940, missing 29 October 1941
Kete	United States Navy	Balao	fleet submarine	2,391	31 July 1944	Missing after 20 March 1945
Kingfish	United States Navy	Gato	fleet submarine	2,424	20 May 1942	Sold for scrap 6 October 1960
Kraken	United States Navy	Balao	fleet submarine	2,391	8 September 1944	Transferred to Spain as Almirante García de los Reyes 24 October 1959; Stricken 1 April 1982; scrapped
Krasnogvardyeyets	Soviet Navy	Dekabrist	submarine	1,354	12 July 1929	Missing after 10 June 1942
L23	Royal Navy	L	submarine	1,106	31 October 1924	Paid off May 1946
L26	Royal Navy	L	submarine	1,106	11 October 1926	Sunk as target 1 November 1946
L27	Royal Navy	L	training submarine	1,106		Scrapped 1944
L'Espoir	French Navy	Redoutable	cruiser submarine	1,968	1 February 1934	Scuttled 27 November 1942
La Psyché	French Navy	Diane	submarine	796	23 December 1933	Sunk 8 November 1942
La Sultane	French Navy; Free French Naval Forces	Argonaute	submarine	785	20 May 1935	Joined the Free French Naval Forces December 1942; sold for scrap 14 August 1946
La Sibylle	French Navy	Diane	submarine	796	22 December 1934	Missing after 8 November 1942
La Vestale	French Navy; Free French Naval Forces	Argonaute	submarine	785	18 September 1934	Joined the Free French Naval Forces December 1942; laid up 1944; sold for scrap 25 March 1946
Lafolè	Regia Marina	Adua	coastal submarine	843	13 August 1938	Sunk 20 October 1940
Lagarto	United States Navy	Balao	fleet submarine	2,391	14 October 1944	Sunk 4 May 1945
Lamprey	United States Navy	Balao	fleet submarine	2,391	17 November 1944	Transferred to Argentina as Santiago del Estero 21 August 1960; scrapped 1974
Lancetfish	United States Navy	Balao	fleet submarine	2,391	12 February 1945	Sank at pier 15 March 1945; never repaired; sold for scrap 20 August 1959
Lapon	United States Navy	Gato	fleet submarine	2,424	23 January 1943	Transferred to Greece as Poseidon 10 August 1957; retired April 1976
Le Centaure	French Navy; Free French Naval Forces	Redoutable	cruiser submarine	1,968	1 January 1935	Scrapped June 1952
Le Conquérant	French Navy	Redoutable	cruiser submarine	1,968	7 September 1936	Sunk 13 November 1942
Le Glorieux	French Navy; Free French Naval Forces	Redoutable	cruiser submarine	1,968	1 June 1934	Scrapped October 1952
Le Héros	French Navy	Redoutable	cruiser submarine	1,968	12 September 1934	Sunk 7 May 1942
Le Tonnant	French Navy	Redoutable	cruiser submarine	1,968	1 June 1937	Scuttled 15 November 1942
Lembit	Estonian Navy; Soviet Navy	Kalev	minelayer submarine	853	14 May 1937	Captured by Soviet Union 18 September 1940; museum ship 5 May 1985
Leonardo da Vinci	Regia Marina	Marconi	submarine	1,490	7 April 1940	Sunk 23 May 1943
Ling	United States Navy	Balao	fleet submarine	2,391	8 June 1945	Stricken 1 December 1971; museum ship
Lionfish	United States Navy	Balao	fleet submarine	2,391	1 November 1944	Museum ship 30 August 1972
Lizardfish	United States Navy	Balao	fleet submarine	2,391	30 December 1944	Transferred to Italy as Evangelista Torricelli 9 January 1960; Sold for scrap 1976
Loggerhead	United States Navy	Balao	fleet submarine	2,391	9 February 1945	Sold for scrap 29 August 1969
Luciano Manara	Regia Marina	Bandiera	submarine	1,080	29 July 1930	Stricken 1 February 1948
Luigi Settembrini	Regia Marina	Settembrini	submarine	1,135	29 July 1930	Sunk in collision 15 November 1944
Luigi Torelli	Regia Marina	Marconi	submarine	1,490	15 May 1940	Seized by Germany September 1943; renamed UIT-25; seized by Japan May 1945; renamed I-504; surrendered August 1945; scuttled 12 February 1946
Macabi	United States Navy	Balao	fleet submarine	2,391	29 March 1945	Transferred to Argentina as Santa Fe 11 August 1960; scrapped 1974
Macallé	Regia Marina	Adua	coastal submarine	843	1 March 1937	Wrecked and sank 15 June 1940
Mackerel	United States Navy	Mackerel	submarine	1,190	31 March 1941	Sold for scrap 24 April 1947
Maggiore Baracca	Regia Marina	Marconi	submarine	1,490	10 July 1940	Sunk 7 September 1941
Malachite	Regia Marina	Perla	coastal submarine	839	6 November 1936	Sunk 9 February 1943
Manta	United States Navy	Balao	fleet submarine	2,391	18 December 1944	Sunk as target 16 July 1969
Mapiro	United States Navy	Balao	fleet submarine	2,391	30 April 1945	Transferred to Turkey as Piri Reis 18 March 1960; scrapped 1973
Marcantonio Bragadin	Regia Marina	Bragadin	submarine	981	16 November 1931	Stricken 1 February 1948
Marcantonio Colonna	Regia Marina	Pisani	submarine	1,040	10 July 1929	Decommissioned 16 April 1942; scrapped 1943
Marcello	Regia Marina	Marcello	submarine	1,313	5 March 1938	Missing from late February 1941
Marea	Regia Marina	Flutto	submarine	1,093	7 May 1943	Stricken 1 February 1948; transferred to the Soviet Union 7 February 1949
Marlin	United States Navy	Mackerel	submarine	1,165	1 August 1941	Sold for scrap 29 March 1946
Marsouin	French Navy; Free French Naval Forces	Requin	submarine	1,132	7 September 1927	Joined Free French Naval Forces ca. December 1942; disarmed April 1944; stricken 28 February 1946
Marsuinul	Royal Romanian Navy		submarine	620	May 1943	Captured by the Soviets in August 1944, returned 1951 and scrapped 1967
Matchanu	Royal Thai Navy	Matchanu	submarine	420	19 July 1938	Scrapped in 1952
Medregal	United States Navy	Tench	fleet submarine	2,414	14 April 1945	Sold for scrap 13 June 1972
Medusa	Regia Marina	Argonauta	coastal submarine	1,080	25 September 1932	Sunk 30 January 1942
Méduse	French Navy	Diane	submarine	796	1 September 1932	Wrecked 10 November 1942
Menhaden	United States Navy	Balao	fleet submarine	2,391	22 June 1945	Sold for scrap 1988
Mero	United States Navy	Balao	fleet submarine	2,391	17 August 1945	Transferred to Turkey as Hızırreis 20 April 1960; discarded 1977
Michele Bianchi	Regia Marina	Marconi	submarine	1,490	15 April 1940	Sunk 5 July 1941
Minerve	French Navy; Free French Naval Forces	Minerve	submarine	856	15 September 1936	Wrecked 19 September 1945
Mingo	United States Navy	Gato	fleet submarine	2,424	12 February 1943	Transferred to Japan as Kuroshio 15 August 1955; sunk as target 1973
Mocenigo	Regia Marina	Marcello	submarine	1,313	14 August 1938	Sunk 13 May 1943
Monge	French Navy	Redoutable	cruiser submarine	1,968	19 June 1932	Sunk 8 May 1942
Moray	United States Navy	Balao	fleet submarine	2,391	26 January 1945	Sunk as target 18 June 1970
Morosini	Regia Marina	Marcello	submarine	1,313	9 November 1938	Missing after 8 August 1942
Morse (Q119)	French Navy	Requin	submarine	1,132	10 February 1928	Sunk 16 June 1940
Morse (P87)	Free French Naval Forces	V	submarine	740	1 December 1944	Formerly HMS Vortex; returned to the United Kingdom 17 September 1946; loaned to Denmark as U 3 (later renamed Sælen) 1947; returned to the United Kingdom 16 January 1958 scrapped September 1958
Murena	Regia Marina	Flutto	submarine	1,093	25 August 1943	Scuttled 9 September 1943; refloated by Germany; renamed UIT-16; destroyed in port 4 September 1944
Muskallunge	United States Navy	Gato	fleet submarine	2,424	15 March 1943	Transferred to Brazil as Humaitá 18 January 1957; sunk as target 9 July 1968
Naïade	French Navy	Sirène	submarine	745	1927	Scuttled 27 November 1942
Naiade	Regia Marina	Sirena	coastal submarine	837	14 November 1933	Sunk 14 December 1940
Nani	Regia Marina	Marcello	submarine	1,313	5 September 1938	Sunk 7 January 1941
Narodovolets	Soviet Navy	Dekabrist	submarine	1,354	19 May 1929	Museum ship 1989
Narval	French Navy	Requin	submarine	1,132	23 July 1926	Sunk 15 December 1940
Narval	French Navy	Acciaio	coastal submarine	864	2 January 1942	Formerly Italian submarine Bronzo, captured by Royal Navy 12 July 1943; commissioned as HMS P714; transferred to France 29 January 1944; scrapped 1948
Narvalo	Regia Marina	Squalo	submarine	1,107	6 December 1930	Sunk 14 January 1943
Narwhal	Royal Navy	Grampus	submarine	2,157	28 February 1936	Sunk 23 July 1940
Narwhal	United States Navy	V-5	submarine	3,900	15 May 1930	Sold for scrap 16 November 1945
Nautilo	Regia Marina	Flutto	submarine	1,093	26 July 1943	Captured by Germany 9 September 1943; renamed UIT-19, but not commissioned; sunk 9 January 1944; seized and refloated postwar by Yugoslavia; commissioned 1949 as Sava; scrapped 1971
Nautilus	United States Navy	V-5	submarine	3,900	1 July 1930	Sold for scrap 16 November 1945
Nautilus	French Navy	Saphir	minelayer submarine	925	15 July 1931	Captured by Italy 8 December 1942; sunk 31 January 1943; refloated; not repaired; stricken 12 August 1947
Nebojša	Royal Yugoslav Navy	Hrabri	submarine	1,164	1927	Scrapped in 1958
Neghelli	Regia Marina	Adua	coastal submarine	843	28 February 1938	Sunk 19 January 1941
Nereide	Regia Marina	Sirena	coastal submarine	837	18 February 1934	Sunk 13 July 1943
Nichelio	Regia Marina	Acciaio	coastal submarine	864	30 July 1942	Stricken 1 February 1948; transferred to Soviet Union 1949; scrapped 1960
O 9	Royal Netherlands Navy	O 9	submarine	656	18 January 1926	Scrapped October 1946
O 10	Royal Netherlands Navy	O 9	submarine	656	1 September 1926	Scrapped October 1946
O 11	Royal Netherlands Navy	O 9	submarine	656	18 January 1926	Sunk in 1940 after taking damage from a collision
O 12	Royal Netherlands Navy; Kriegsmarine	O 12	submarine	754	20 July 1931	Scuttled in 1940, raised by Nazi Germany's Kriegsmarine and taken into service as U-D2
O 13	Royal Netherlands Navy	O 12	submarine	754	1 October 1931	Lost during patrol in the North Sea on 25 June 1940
O 14	Royal Netherlands Navy	O 12	submarine	754	4 March 1932	Decommissioned in 1943 due to a lack of replacement engines
O 15	Royal Netherlands Navy	O 12	submarine	754	28 July 1932	Paid off 2 October 1946
O 16	Royal Netherlands Navy	O 16	submarine	1,194	27 January 1936	Sunk by mine on 15 December 1941
O 19	Royal Netherlands Navy	O 19	submarine	1,491	22 September 1938	Scuttled on 10 July 1945
O 20	Royal Netherlands Navy	O 19	submarine	1,491	28 August 1939	Sunk 19 December 1941
O 21	Royal Netherlands Navy	O 21	submarine	1,205	10 May 1940	Sold for scrap 24 January 1958
O 22	Royal Netherlands Navy	O 21	submarine	1,205	10 May 1940	Lost during a patrol in the North Sea in 1940
O 23	Royal Netherlands Navy	O 21	submarine	1,205	13 May 1940	Sold for scrap April 1949
O 24	Royal Netherlands Navy	O 21	submarine	1,205	13 May 1940	Sold for scrap 1963
O 25	Royal Netherlands Navy; Kriegsmarine	O 21	submarine	1,205	8 June 1941	Captured during the invasion of the Netherlands and commissioned in the Kriegsmarine as U-D3
O 26	Royal Netherlands Navy; Kriegsmarine	O 21	submarine	1,205	28 January 1941	Captured during the invasion of the Netherlands and commissioned in the Kriegsmarine as U-D4
O 27	Royal Netherlands Navy; Kriegsmarine	O 21	submarine	1,205	26 September 1941	Captured during the invasion of the Netherlands and commissioned in the Kriegsmarine as U-D5
O-2	United States Navy	O	submarine	629	19 October 1918	Sold for scrap 16 November 1945
O-3	United States Navy	O	submarine	629	13 June 1918	Sold for scrap 4 September 1946
O-4	United States Navy	O	submarine	629	29 May 1918	Decommissioned 20 September 1945, scrapped 1 February 1946
O-6	United States Navy	O	submarine	629	12 June 1918	Sold for scrap 4 September 1946
O-7	United States Navy	O	submarine	629	4 July 1918	Sold for scrap 22 January 1946
O-8	United States Navy	O	submarine	629	11 July 1918	Sold for scrap 4 September 1946
O-9	United States Navy	O	submarine	629	27 July 1918	Foundered 20 June 1941
O-10	United States Navy	O	submarine	629	17 August 1918	Sold for scrap 21 August 1946
Oberon	Royal Navy	Odin	submarine	1,922	24 August 1927	Paid off 5 July 1944
Odax	United States Navy	Tench	fleet submarine	2,414	11 July 1945	Transferred to Brazil as Rio de Janeiro 8 July 1972; scrapped 1981
Odin	Royal Navy	Odin	submarine	2,038	21 December 1929	Sunk 14 June 1940
Ouessant	French Navy	Redoutable	cruiser submarine	1,968	1 January 1939	Scuttled 18 June 1940
Olympus	Royal Navy	Odin	submarine	2,038	14 June 1930	Sunk 8 May 1942
Onice	Regia Marina	Perla	coastal submarine	839	1 September 1936	Stricken 1 February 1948
Ondina	Regia Marina	Sirena	coastal submarine	837	19 September 1934	Sunk 11 July 1942
Ondine	French Navy; Free French Naval Forces	Orion	submarine	775	5 July 1932	Stricken April 1943 and dismantled for spare parts
Oréade	French Navy	Diane	submarine	796	14 December 1933	Sunk 8 November 1942
Orion	French Navy; Free French Naval Forces	Orion	submarine	775	5 July 1932	Stricken April 1943 and dismantled for spare parts
Orphée	French Navy; Free French Naval Forces	Diane	submarine	796	8 June 1933	Stricken 15 April 1946
Orpheus	Royal Navy	Odin	submarine	2,038	23 September 1930	Sunk 19 June 1940
Orzeł	Polish Navy	Orzeł	submarine	1,473	2 February 1939	Lost 8 June 1940
Osiris	Royal Navy	Odin	submarine	2,038	25 January 1929	Paid off 7 March 1945
Osvetnik	Royal Yugoslav Navy; Regia Marina	Ostevnik	submarine	809	14 January 1929	Captured by Italy 1941, scuttled by Germany in 1943
Oswald	Royal Navy	Odin	submarine	2,038	1 May 1929	Sunk 1 August 1940
Otaria	Regia Marina	Glauco	submarine	1,305	20 October 1935	Stricken 1 February 1948
Otus	Royal Navy	Odin	submarine	2,038	5 July 1929	Paid off March 1946
Otway	Royal Navy	Odin	submarine	1,922	15 June 1927	Paid off 1945
Oxley	Royal Navy	Odin	submarine	1,922	1 April 1927	Sunk by friendly fire 10 September 1939
P31	Royal Navy	U	submarine	730	2 April 1941	Renamed Ullswater February 1943; renamed Uproar April 1943; sold for scrap 13 February 1946
P32	Royal Navy	U	submarine	730	3 May 1941	Sunk 18 August 1941
P33	Royal Navy	U	submarine	730	30 May 1941	Missing after 6 August 1941
P36	Royal Navy	U	submarine	730	24 September 1941	Sunk 1 April 1942
P38	Royal Navy	U	submarine	730	17 October 1941	Sunk 23 February 1942
P39	Royal Navy	U	submarine	730	16 November 1941	Damaged beyond repair 26 March 1942; scrapped 1954
P48	Royal Navy	U	submarine	730	18 June 1942	Sunk 25 December 1942
P222	Royal Navy	S (Third Group)	submarine	990	4 March 1942	Sunk 12 December 1942
P311	Royal Navy	T	submarine	1,560	7 August 1942	Sunk 8 January 1943
P511	Royal Navy	R	training submarine	680	17 April 1919	Former USS R-3, transferred to United Kingdom 4 November 1941; scrapped 1948
P512	Royal Navy	R	training submarine	680	17 August 1918	Former USS R-17, transferred to United Kingdom 9 March 1942; sold for scrap 6 November 1945
P514	Royal Navy	R	training submarine	680	7 October 1918	Former USS R-19, transferred to United Kingdom 9 March 1942; sunk 21 June 1942
P551	Royal Navy	S (Holland design)	submarine	1,062	9 July 1923	Former USS S-25, transferred to United Kingdom 4 November 1941; loaned to Polish government-in-exile as Jastrząb 4 November 1941; sunk 2 May 1942
P552	Royal Navy	S (Navy design)	submarine	1,092	5 June 1920	Former USS S-1, transferred to United Kingdom 20 April 1942; sold for scrap 14 September 1945
P553	Royal Navy	S (Holland design)	submarine	1,062	24 August 1921	Former USS S-21, transferred to United Kingdom 14 September 1942; sunk as target 23 March 1945
P554	Royal Navy	S (Holland design)	submarine	1,062	23 June 1924	Former USS S-22, transferred to United Kingdom 19 June 1942; sold for scrap 16 November 1945
P555	Royal Navy	S (Holland design)	submarine	1,062	24 August 1923	Former USS S-24, transferred to United Kingdom 10 August 1942; scuttled 25 August 1947
P556	Royal Navy	S (Holland design)	submarine	1,062	22 May 1924	Former USS S-29, transferred to the United Kingdom 5 June 1942; sold for scrap, 24 January 1947
P611	Royal Navy	Oruç Reis	submarine	856	1 December 1941	Transferred to Turkey as Oruç Reis 9 May 1942; scrapped 1957
P612	Royal Navy	Oruç Reis	submarine	856	7 January 1942	Transferred to Turkey as Murat Reis 16 May 1942; scrapped 1957
P614	Royal Navy	Oruç Reis	submarine	856	10 March 1942	Transferred to Turkey 1945; commissioned as Burak Reis 17 January 1946; scrapped 1957
P615	Royal Navy	Oruç Reis	submarine	856	3 April 1942	Sunk 18 April 1943
P714	Royal Navy	Acciaio	coastal submarine	864	2 January 1942	Formerly Italian submarine Bronzo, captured by Royal Navy 12 July 1943; transferred to France as Narval 29 January 1944; scrapped 1948
Paddle	United States Navy	Gato	fleet submarine	2,424	29 March 1943	Transferred to Brazil as Riachuelo 18 January 1957; sunk as target ca. 30 June 1968
Pallas	French Navy	Minerve	submarine	856	12 June 1939	Scuttled 9 November 1942
Pampanito	United States Navy	Balao	fleet submarine	2,391	6 November 1943	Museum ship 21 November 1975
Pandora	Royal Navy	Parthian	submarine	2,040	30 June 1930	Sunk 1 April 1942, scrapped 1955
Komissar	Soviet Navy	Bars	submarine	1,354	1916	Converted to harbor training ship 1941
Parche	United States Navy	Balao	fleet submarine	2,391	20 November 1943	Sold for scrap 18 June 1970
Pargo	United States Navy	Gato	fleet submarine	2,424	26 April 1943	Sold for scrap 16 May 1961
Parthian	Royal Navy	Parthian	submarine	2,040	30 June 1930	Sunk August 1943
Pascal	French Navy	Redoutable	cruiser submarine	1,968	10 September 1931	Scuttled 27 November 1942; refloated; sunk 11 March 1944
Pasteur	French Navy	Redoutable	cruiser submarine	1,968	1 September 1932	Scuttled 18 June 1940
Pégase	French Navy	Redoutable	cruiser submarine	1,968	19 June 1932	Decommissioned 1 January 1944; scrapped 1951
Perch (SS-176)	United States Navy	Porpoise	fleet submarine	1,997	19 November 1936	Scuttled 3 March 1942
Perch (SS-313)	United States Navy	Balao	fleet submarine	2,391	7 January 1944	Sold for scrap 15 January 1973
Perla	Regia Marina; Royal Navy; Hellenic Navy	Perla	coastal submarine	846	8 July 1936	Captured by UK as HMS P-712 9 July 1942, to Greece as Matrozos 1943, stricken 1947
Perle	French Navy; Free French Naval Forces	Saphir	minelayer submarine	925	1 March 1937	Sunk 8 July 1944
Permit	United States Navy	Porpoise	fleet submarine	1,997	17 March 1937	Sold for scrap 28 June 1958
Persée	French Navy	Redoutable	cruiser submarine	1,968	10 June 1934	Sunk 23 September 1940
Perseus	Royal Navy	Parthian	submarine	2,040	15 April 1930	Sunk 6 December 1941.
Peto	United States Navy	Gato	fleet submarine	2,424	21 November 1942	Sold for scrap 29 November 1960
Phoenix	Royal Navy	Parthian	submarine	2,040	3 February 1931	Sunk 16 July 1940
Phoque	French Navy	Requin	submarine	1,132	7 May 1928	Captured by Italy 8 December 1942; renamed FR 111; sunk 28 February 1943
Phlai-chumphon	Royal Thai Navy	Matchanu	submarine	420	19 July 1938	Scrapped 1952
Pickerel	United States Navy	Porpoise	fleet submarine	1,997	26 January 1937	Sunk 3 April 1943
Picuda	United States Navy	Balao	fleet submarine	2,391	16 October 1943	Transferred to Spain as Narciso Monturiol 1 October 1972; Stricken 30 April 1977
Pier Capponi	Regia Marina	Mameli	submarine	993	19 January 1929	Sunk 31 March 1941
Pietro Calvi	Regia Marina	Calvi	cruiser submarine	2,028	16 October 1935	Sunk 14 July 1942
Pietro Micca	Regia Marina		minelayer submarine	1,883	1 October 1935	Sunk 29 July 1943
Pike	United States Navy	Porpoise	fleet submarine	1,934	2 December 1935	Sold for scrap 14 January 1957
Pilotfish	United States Navy	Balao	fleet submarine	2,391	16 December 1943	Sunk as target 25 July 1946
Pintado	United States Navy	Balao	fleet submarine	2,391	1 January 1944	Sold for scrap 19 February 1969
Pipefish	United States Navy	Balao	fleet submarine	2,391	22 January 1944	Sold for scrap 4 February 1969
Piper	United States Navy	Balao	fleet submarine	2,391	23 August 1944	Sold for scrap June 1971
Pipinos	Royal Hellenic Navy	V	submarine	740	1 November 1943	Formerly HMS Veldt; returned to United Kingdom 10 December 1957; scrapped February 1958
Piranha	United States Navy	Balao	fleet submarine	2,391	5 February 1944	Sold for scrap 11 August 1970
Plaice	United States Navy	Balao	fleet submarine	2,391	12 February 1944	Transferred to Brazil as Bahia 7 September 1963; scrapped 1973
Platino	Regia Marina	Acciaio	coastal submarine	864	2 October 1941	Stricken 1 February 1948
Plunger	United States Navy	Porpoise	fleet submarine	1,997	19 November 1936	Sold for scrap 22 April 1957
Pogy	United States Navy	Gato	fleet submarine	2,424	10 January 1943	Sold for scrap 1 May 1959
Pollack	United States Navy	Porpoise	fleet submarine	1,997	15 January 1937	Sold for scrap 2 February 1947
Pomfret	United States Navy	Balao	fleet submarine	2,391	19 February 1944	Transferred to Turkey as Oruçreis 1 July 1971; retired 1987
Pompano	United States Navy	Porpoise	fleet submarine	1,997	12 June 1937	Lost September 1943
Pompon	United States Navy	Gato	fleet submarine	2,424	17 March 1943	Sold for scrap 22 December 1960
Poncelet	French Navy	Redoutable	cruiser submarine	1,968	1 September 1932	Scuttled 7 November 1940
Porfido	Regia Marina	Acciaio	coastal submarine	864	24 January 1942	Sunk 6 December 1942
Porpoise	United States Navy	Porpoise	fleet submarine	1,934	15 August 1935	Sold for scrap 14 May 1957
Porpoise	Royal Navy	Grampus	submarine	2,035	11 March 1933	Sunk 19 January 1945
Poseidon	Royal Navy	Parthian	submarine	2,040	5 May 1930	Sunk in accidental collision with a merchant ship 9 June 1931
Provana	Regia Marina	Marcello	submarine	1,313	25 June 1938	Sunk 16 June 1940
Protée	French Navy; Free French Naval Forces	Redoutable	cruiser submarine	1,968	1 November 1932	Sunk 20 December 1943
Proteus	Royal Navy	Parthian	submarine	2,040	5 May 1930	Scrapped March 1946
Puffer	United States Navy	Gato	fleet submarine	2,424	27 April 1943	Sold for scrap 3 December 1960
Queenfish	United States Navy	Balao	fleet submarine	2,391	11 March 1944	Sunk as target 14 August 1963
Quidora	Chilean Navy	H	submarine	434	1917	Scrapped 1945
Quillback	United States Navy	Tench	fleet submarine	2,414	29 December 1944	Sold for scrap 21 March 1974
R-1	United States Navy	R	coastal submarine	680	16 December 1918	Sold for scrap 16 March 1946
R-2	United States Navy	R	coastal submarine	680	24 January 1919	Sold for scrap 28 September 1945
R-3	United States Navy	R	coastal submarine	680	28 March 1919	Transferred to United Kingdom as P511 4 November 1941; scrapped 1948
R-4	United States Navy	R	coastal submarine	680	17 April 1919	Sold for scrap January 1946
R-5	United States Navy	R	coastal submarine	680	15 April 1919	Sold for scrap 22 August 1946
R-6	United States Navy	R	coastal submarine	680	1 May 1919	Sold for scrap March 1946
R-7	United States Navy	R	coastal submarine	680	12 June 1919	Sold for scrap September 1946
R-9	United States Navy	R	coastal submarine	680	30 July 1919	Sold for scrap February 1946
R-10	United States Navy	R	coastal submarine	680	20 August 1919	Sold for scrap January 1946
R-11	United States Navy	R	coastal submarine	680	5 September 1919	Scrapped 1948
R-12	United States Navy	R	coastal submarine	680	23 September 1919	Sank 12 June 1943
R-13	United States Navy	R	coastal submarine	680	17 October 1919	Sold for scrap 13 March 1946
R-14	United States Navy	R	coastal submarine	680	24 December 1919	Scrapped 1946
R-15	United States Navy	R	coastal submarine	680	27 July 1918	Sold for scrap October 1945
R-16	United States Navy	R	coastal submarine	680	5 August 1918	Sold for scrap March 1946
R-17	United States Navy	R	coastal submarine	680	17 August 1918	Transferred to United Kingdom as P512 9 March 1942; sold for scrap 6 November 1945
R-18	United States Navy	R	coastal submarine	680	11 September 1918	Sold for scrap 1946
R-19	United States Navy	R	coastal submarine	680	7 October 1918	Transferred to United Kingdom as P514 9 March 1942; sunk 21 June 1942
R-20	United States Navy	R	coastal submarine	680	26 October 1918	Sold for scrap 13 March 1946
Rainbow	Royal Navy	Rainbow	submarine	2,030	18 January 1932	Sunk 4 October 1940 in collision
Rasher	United States Navy	Gato	fleet submarine	2,424	8 June 1943	Sold for scrap 7 August 1974
Raton	United States Navy	Gato	fleet submarine	2,424	13 July 1943	Sold for scrap 12 October 1973
Ray	United States Navy	Gato	fleet submarine	2,424	27 July 1943	Sold for scrap 18 December 1960
Razorback	United States Navy	Balao	fleet submarine	2,391	3 April 1944	Transferred to Turkey as Muratreis 30 November 1970; museum ship 15 May 2005
Rechinul	Royal Romanian Navy	Rechinul	submarine	789	May 1943	Captured by the Soviets in August 1944, sunk by accident February 1945
Redfin	United States Navy	Gato	fleet submarine	2,424	31 August 1943	Sold for scrap 31 March 1971
Redfish	United States Navy	Balao	fleet submarine	2,391	12 April 1944	Sunk as target 6 February 1969
Redoutable	French Navy	Redoutable	cruiser submarine	1,968	10 July 1931	Scuttled 27 November 1942; refloated 16 May 1943; sunk 11 March 1944
Regent	Royal Navy	Rainbow	submarine	2,030	11 November 1930	Sunk 18 April 1943
Reginaldo Giuliani	Regia Marina	Liuzzi	submarine	1,484	3 February 1940	Seized by Germany 8 September 1943; renamed UIT-23; sunk 18 February 1944
Regulus	Royal Navy	Rainbow	submarine	2,030	7 December 1930	Sunk 6 December 1940
Remo	Regia Marina	R	transport submarine	2,520	19 June 1943	Sunk 15 July 1943
Requin	French Navy	Requin	submarine	1,132	28 May 1926	Captured by Italy 8 December 1942; renamed FR 113; captured by Germany 9 September 1943; sold for scrap 1944
Requin	United States Navy	Tench	fleet submarine	2,414	28 April 1945	Museum ship 1972
Revolutsioner	Soviet Navy	Dekabrist	submarine	1,354	12 March 1929	Missing after 1 December 1943
Ro-31	Imperial Japanese Navy	Kaichū V type	training submarine	1,030	10 May 1927	Scuttled 5 April 1946
Ro-33	Imperial Japanese Navy	Kaichū VI type	submarine	1,200	7 October 1935	Sunk 29 August 1942
Ro-34	Imperial Japanese Navy	Kaichū VI type	submarine	1,200	31 May 1937	Sunk 7 April 1943
Ro-35	Imperial Japanese Navy	Kaichū VII type	submarine	1,447	25 March 1943	Sunk 25 August 1943
Ro-36	Imperial Japanese Navy	Kaichū VII type	submarine	1,447	27 May 1943	Sunk 13 June 1944
Ro-37	Imperial Japanese Navy	Kaichū VII type	submarine	1,447	30 June 1943	Sunk 22 January 1944
Ro-38	Imperial Japanese Navy	Kaichū VII type	submarine	1,447	24 July 1943	Missing after 19 November 1943
Ro-39	Imperial Japanese Navy	Kaichū VII type	submarine	1,447	12 September 1943	Sunk 1 February 1944
Ro-40	Imperial Japanese Navy	Kaichū VII type	submarine	1,447	28 September 1943	Sunk 16 February 1944
Ro-41	Imperial Japanese Navy	Kaichū VII type	submarine	1,447	26 November 1943	Sunk 23 March 1945
Ro-42	Imperial Japanese Navy	Kaichū VII type	submarine	1,447	31 August 1943	Sunk 11 June 1944
Ro-43	Imperial Japanese Navy	Kaichū VII type	submarine	1,447	16 December 1943	Sunk 26 February 1945
Ro-44	Imperial Japanese Navy	Kaichū VII type	submarine	1,447	13 September 1943	Sunk 16 June 1944
Ro-45	Imperial Japanese Navy	Kaichū VII type	submarine	1,447	11 January 1944	Sunk 30 April 1944
Ro-46	Imperial Japanese Navy	Kaichū VII type	submarine	1,447	19 February 1944	Missing after 17 April 1945
Ro-47	Imperial Japanese Navy	Kaichū VII type	submarine	1,447	31 January 1944	Sunk 26 September 1944
Ro-48	Imperial Japanese Navy	Kaichū VII type	submarine	1,447	31 March 1944	Sunk 19 July 1944
Ro-49	Imperial Japanese Navy	Kaichū VII type	submarine	1,447	19 May 1944	Missing after 25 March 1945
Ro-50	Imperial Japanese Navy	Kaichū VII type	submarine	1,447	31 July 1944	Scuttled 1 April 1946
Ro-55	Imperial Japanese Navy	Kaichū VII type	submarine	1,447	30 September 1944	Sunk 7 February 1945
Ro-56	Imperial Japanese Navy	Kaichū VII type	submarine	1,447	15 November 1944	Sunk 9 April 1945
Ro-57	Imperial Japanese Navy	Type L3	training submarine	1,102.7	30 July 1922	Scrapped 1946
Ro-58	Imperial Japanese Navy	Type L3	training submarine	1,102.7	25 November 1922	Scrapped 1946
Ro-59	Imperial Japanese Navy	Type L3	training submarine	1,102.7	20 March 1923	Scrapped 1946
Ro-60	Imperial Japanese Navy	Type L4	submarine	1,301	17 September 1923	Wrecked 29 December 1941
Ro-61	Imperial Japanese Navy	Type L4	submarine	1,301	9 February 1924	Sunk 31 August 1942
Ro-62	Imperial Japanese Navy	Type L4	submarine	1,301	24 July 1924	Scuttled May 1946
Ro-63	Imperial Japanese Navy	Type L4	submarine	1,301	20 December 1924	Scuttled May 1946
Ro-64	Imperial Japanese Navy	Type L4	submarine	1,301	30 April 1925	Sunk 12 April 1945
Ro-65	Imperial Japanese Navy	Type L4	submarine	1,301	30 June 1926	Sunk in diving accident 3 November 1942
Ro-66	Imperial Japanese Navy	Type L4	submarine	1,301	28 July 1927	Sunk in collision 17 December 1941
Ro-67	Imperial Japanese Navy	Type L4	submarine	1,301	15 December 1926	Scrapped 1946
Ro-68	Imperial Japanese Navy	Type L4	submarine	1,301	29 October 1925	Scuttled 30 April 1946
Ro-100	Imperial Japanese Navy	Ko type	coastal submarine	782	23 September 1942	Sunk 25 November 1943
Ro-101	Imperial Japanese Navy	Ko type	coastal submarine	782	31 October 1942	Sunk 15 September 1943
Ro-102	Imperial Japanese Navy	Ko type	coastal submarine	782	17 November 1942	Missing after 9 May 1943
Ro-103	Imperial Japanese Navy	Ko type	coastal submarine	782	21 October 1942	Missing after 28 July 1943
Ro-104	Imperial Japanese Navy	Ko type	coastal submarine	782	25 February 1943	Sunk 23 May 1944
Ro-105	Imperial Japanese Navy	Ko type	coastal submarine	782	5 March 1943	Sunk 31 May 1944
Ro-106	Imperial Japanese Navy	Ko type	coastal submarine	782	26 December 1942	Sunk 22 May 1944
Ro-107	Imperial Japanese Navy	Ko type	coastal submarine	782	26 December 1942	Missing after 6 July 1943
Ro-108	Imperial Japanese Navy	Ko type	coastal submarine	782	20 April 1943	Sunk 26 May 1944
Ro-109	Imperial Japanese Navy	Ko type	coastal submarine	782	30 April 1943	Sunk 25 April 1945
Ro-110	Imperial Japanese Navy	Ko type	coastal submarine	782	6 July 1943	Sunk 11 February 1944
Ro-111	Imperial Japanese Navy	Ko type	coastal submarine	782	19 July 1943	Sunk 10 June 1944
Ro-112	Imperial Japanese Navy	Ko type	coastal submarine	782	14 September 1943	Sunk 11 February 1945
Ro-113	Imperial Japanese Navy	Ko type	coastal submarine	782	12 October 1943	Sunk 13 February 1945
Ro-114	Imperial Japanese Navy	Ko type	coastal submarine	782	20 November 1943	Sunk 17 June 1944
Ro-115	Imperial Japanese Navy	Ko type	coastal submarine	782	30 November 1943	Sunk 1 February 1945
Ro-116	Imperial Japanese Navy	Ko type	coastal submarine	782	21 January 1944	Sunk 24 May 1944
Ro-117	Imperial Japanese Navy	Ko type	coastal submarine	782	31 January 1944	Sunk 17 June 1944
Ro-500 (ex-U-511)	Imperial Japanese Navy	Type IXC	submarine	1,213	16 September 1943	Scuttled 30 April 1946
Ro-501 (ex-U-1224)	Imperial Japanese Navy	Type IXC/40	submarine	1,237	15 February 1944	Sunk 13 May 1944
Robalo	United States Navy	Gato	fleet submarine	2,424	28 September 1943	Sunk 26 July 1944
Rock	United States Navy	Gato	fleet submarine	2,424	26 October 1943	Sold for scrap 17 August 1972
Romolo	Regia Marina	R	transport submarine	2,520	19 June 1943	Sunk 18 July 1943
Roncador	United States Navy	Balao	fleet submarine	2,391	27 March 1945	Stricken 1971; scrapped ca. 1982
Ronis	Latvian Naval Forces; Soviet Navy	Ronis	submarine	514	1927	Captured by Soviet Union 13 August 1940, scuttled 24 June 1941
Ronquil	United States Navy	Balao	fleet submarine	2,391	22 April 1944	Transferred to Spain as Isaac Peral 1 July 1971; decommissioned 3 April 1984
Rorqual	Royal Navy	Grampus	submarine	2,157	10 February 1937	Scrapped 1946
Rover	Royal Navy	Rainbow	submarine	2,030	29 January 1931	Scrapped 1946
Rubino	Regia Marina	Sirena	coastal submarine	837	21 March 1934	Sunk 29 June 1940
Rubis	French Navy; Free French Naval Forces	Saphir	minelayer submarine	925	4 April 1933	Scuttled 31 January 1958
Rucumilla	Chilean Navy	H	submarine	434	1917	Scrapped 1945
Ruggiero Settimo	Regia Marina	Settembrini	submarine	1,135	25 April 1932	Stricken 23 March 1947
Runner (SS-275)	United States Navy	Gato	fleet submarine	2,424	30 July 1942	Missing June 1943
Runner (SS-476)	United States Navy	Tench	fleet submarine	2,414	6 February 1945	Sold for scrap 19 June 1973
Ryś	Polish Navy	Wilk	submarine	1,250	1932	Interned 17 September 1939, decommissioned 1955, scrapped 1956
S-1	Soviet Navy	Srednyaya (IX series)	submarine	1,050	11 September 1936	scuttled 23 June 1941
S-1	United States Navy	S (Holland design)	submarine	1,062	5 June 1920	Transferred to the United Kingdom as P552 20 April 1942; sold for scrap 14 September 1945
S-2	Soviet Navy	Srednyaya (IX series)	submarine	1,050	23 September 1936	Sunk 3 January 1940
S-3	Soviet Navy	Srednyaya (IX series)	submarine	1,050	8 July 1938	Sunk 24 June 1941
S-4	Soviet Navy	Srednyaya (IX-bis series)	submarine	1,050	30 October 1939	Sunk 7 January 1945
S-5	Soviet Navy	Srednyaya (IX-bis series)	submarine	1,050	30 October 1939	Sunk 28 August 1941
S-6	Soviet Navy	Srednyaya (IX-bis series)	submarine	1,050	30 October 1939	Missing after 6 August 1941
S-7	Soviet Navy	Srednyaya (IX-bis series)	submarine	1,050	30 June 1940	Sunk 21 October 1942
S-8	Soviet Navy	Srednyaya (IX-bis series)	submarine	1,050	30 June 1940	Missing after 11 October 1941
S-9	Soviet Navy	Srednyaya (IX-bis series)	submarine	1,050	31 October 1940	Missing August 1943
S-10	Soviet Navy	Srednyaya (IX-bis series)	submarine	1,050	25 December 1940	Sunk around 28 June 1941
S-11	Soviet Navy	Srednyaya (IX-bis series)	submarine	1,050	27 June 1941	Sunk 2 August 1941, raised 1955, scrapped 1957–1958
S-11	United States Navy	S (Navy design)	submarine	1,092	11 January 1923	Sold for scrap 28 October 1945
S-12	Soviet Navy	Srednyaya (IX-bis series)	submarine	1,050	24 July 1941	Missing 1 August 1943
S-12	United States Navy	S (Navy design)	submarine	1,092	30 April 1923	Sold for scrap 28 October 1945
S-13	Soviet Navy	Srednyaya (IX-bis series)	submarine	1,050	31 July 1941	Decommissioned 7 September 1954
S-13	United States Navy	S (Navy design)	submarine	1,092	14 July 1923	Stricken 19 May 1945; sold for scrap
S-14	United States Navy	S (Navy design)	submarine	1,092	11 February 1921	Sold for scrap 16 November 1945
S-15	United States Navy	S (Navy design)	submarine	1,092	17 December 1920	Sold for scrap 4 December 1946
S-16	United States Navy	S (Navy design)	submarine	1,092	15 January 1921	Sunk as target 3 April 1945
S-17	United States Navy	S (Navy design)	submarine	1,092	1 March 1921	Sunk as target 5 April 1945
S-18	United States Navy	S (Holland design)	submarine	1,062	3 April 1924	Sold for scrap 9 November 1946
S-20	United States Navy	S (Holland design)	submarine	1,062	22 November 1922	Sold for scrap 22 January 1946
S-21	United States Navy	S (Holland design)	submarine	1,062	24 August 1921	Transferred to United Kingdom as P553 14 September 1942; sunk as target 23 March 1945
S-22	United States Navy	S (Holland design)	submarine	1,062	23 June 1924	Transferred to United Kingdom as P554 19 June 1942; sold for scrap 16 November 1945
S-23	United States Navy	S (Holland design)	submarine	1,062	30 October 1923	Stricken 16 November 1945; sold for scrap
S-24	United States Navy	S (Holland design)	submarine	1,062	24 August 1923	Transferred to United Kingdom as P555 10 August 1942; scuttled 25 August 1947
S-26	United States Navy	S (Holland design)	submarine	1,062	15 October 1923	Sunk in collision 24 January 1942
S-27	United States Navy	S (Holland design)	submarine	1,062	22 January 1924	Wrecked 19 June 1942
S-28	United States Navy	S (Holland design)	submarine	1,062	13 December 1923	Sank in diving accident 4 July 1944
S-29	United States Navy	S (Holland design)	submarine	1,062	22 May 1924	Transferred to the United Kingdom as P556 5 June 1942; sold for scrap, 24 January 1947
S-30	United States Navy	S (Holland design)	submarine	1,062	29 October 1920	Sold for scrap December 1946
S-31	Soviet Navy	Srednyaya (IX-bis series)	submarine	1,050	19 June 1940	Decommissioned 14 March 1955
S-31	United States Navy	S (Holland design)	submarine	1,062	11 May 1922	Scrapped July 1947
S-32	Soviet Navy	Srednyaya (IX-bis series)	submarine	1,050	19 June 1940	Probably sunk 26 June 1942
S-32	United States Navy	S (Holland design)	submarine	1,062	15 June 1922	Sold for scrap May 1946
S-33	Soviet Navy	Srednyaya (IX-bis series)	submarine	1,050	18 November 1940	Decommissioned 14 March 1955
S-33	United States Navy	S (Holland design)	submarine	1,062	18 April 1922	Sold for scrap 1946
S-34	Soviet Navy	Srednyaya (IX-bis series)	submarine	1,050	29 March 1941	Sunk 12 November 1941
S-34	United States Navy	S (Holland design)	submarine	1,062	12 July 1922	Sold for scrap 1946
S-35	United States Navy	S (Holland design)	submarine	1,062	17 August 1922	Sunk as target 4 April 1946
S-36	United States Navy	S (Holland design)	submarine	1,062	4 April 1923	Wrecked 20 January 1942
S-37	United States Navy	S (Holland design)	submarine	1,062	16 July 1923	Sank under tow 20 February 1945
S-38	United States Navy	S (Holland design)	submarine	1,062	11 May 1923	Sunk as target 20 February 1945
S-39	United States Navy	S (Holland design)	submarine	1,062	14 September 1923	Wrecked 13 August 1942
S-40	United States Navy	S (Holland design)	submarine	1,062	20 November 1923	Scrapped July 1947
S-41	United States Navy	S (Holland design)	submarine	1,062	15 January 1924	Sold for scrap November 1946
S-42	United States Navy	S (second Holland design)	submarine	1,126	20 November 1924	Sold for scrap November 1946
S-43	United States Navy	S (second Holland design)	submarine	1,126	31 December 1924	Sold for scrap 1946
S-44	United States Navy	S (second Holland design)	submarine	1,126	16 February 1925	Sunk 7 October 1943
S-45	United States Navy	S (second Holland design)	submarine	1,126	31 March 1925	Sold for scrap December 1946
S-46	United States Navy	S (second Holland design)	submarine	1,126	5 June 1925	Sold for scrap November 1946
S-47	United States Navy	S (second Holland design)	submarine	1,126	16 September 1925	Sold for scrap May 1946
S-48	United States Navy	S (second Navy design)	submarine	1,230	14 October 1922	Sold for scrap 22 January 1946
S-51	Soviet Navy	Srednyaya (IX-bis series)	submarine	1,050	30 November 1941	Decommissioned 7 September 1954, preserved as memorial 1973
S-52	Soviet Navy	Srednyaya (IX-bis series)	submarine	1,050	9 June 1943	Stricken 24 August 1954 and transferred to the People's Republic of China
S-53	Soviet Navy	Srednyaya (IX-bis series)	submarine	1,050	30 January 1943	Stricken 24 August 1954 and transferred to the People's Republic of China
S-54	Soviet Navy	Srednyaya (IX-bis series)	submarine	1,050	31 December 1940	Missing 5 March 1944
S-55	Soviet Navy	Srednyaya (IX-bis series)	submarine	1,050	25 July 1941	Lost December 1943
S-56	Soviet Navy	Srednyaya (IX-bis series)	submarine	1,050	20 October 1941	Decommissioned 14 March 1955, preserved as museum ship 1975
S-101	Soviet Navy	Srednyaya (IX-bis series)	submarine	1,050	15 December 1940	Stricken 17 February 1956, scrapped 1957
S-102	Soviet Navy	Srednyaya (IX-bis series)	submarine	1,050	16 December 1940	Decommissioned 14 March 1955
Sabalo	United States Navy	Balao	fleet submarine	2,391	19 June 1945	Sunk as target 15 February 1973
Safari	Royal Navy	S (Third Group)	submarine	990	14 March 1942	Sank under tow 8 January 1946
Saga	Royal Navy	S (Third Group)	submarine	990	14 June 1945	Sold to Portugal as Náutilo 11 October 1948; discarded 1969
Sahib	Royal Navy	S (Third Group)	submarine	990	13 May 1942	Sunk 24 April 1943
Santorre Santarosa	Regia Marina	Bandiera	submarine	1,080	29 July 1930	Scuttled 20 January 1943
Sailfish	United States Navy	Sargo	fleet submarine	2,350	1 March 1939	Sold for scrap 18 June 1948
Salmon	Royal Navy	S (Second Group)	submarine	960	8 March 1935	Sunk 9 July 1940
Salmon	United States Navy	Salmon	fleet submarine	2,198	15 March 1938	Scrapped 1946
Salpa	Regia Marina	Argonauta	coastal submarine	1,080	12 December 1932	Sunk 27 June 1941
Sand Lance	United States Navy	Balao	fleet submarine	2,391	9 October 1943	Transferred to Brazil as Rio Grande do Sul 7 September 1963; stricken 15 September 1972
Sanguine	Royal Navy	S (Third Group)	submarine	990	13 May 1945	Sold to Israel as Rahav 1958; retired 1968
Saphir	French Navy	Saphir	minelayer submarine	925	30 September 1930	Captured by Italy 8 December 1942; renamed FR 112; captured bv Germany and scuttled 15 September 1943
Saracen	Royal Navy	S (Third Group)	submarine	990	27 June 1942	Sunk 14 August 1943
Sargo	United States Navy	Sargo	fleet submarine	2,350	7 February 1939	Sold for scrap 19 May 1947
Satyr	Royal Navy	S (Third Group)	submarine	990	8 February 1943	Transferred to French Navy February 1952
Saukko	Finnish Navy		submarine	140	16 December 1930	Decommissioned 1947, stricken 1952
Saury	United States Navy	Sargo	fleet submarine	2,350	3 April 1939	Sold for scrap 19 May 1947
Sawfish	United States Navy	Gato	fleet submarine	2,424	26 August 1942	Sold for scrap 2 December 1960
Scabbardfish	United States Navy	Balao	fleet submarine	2,391	29 April 1944	Transferred to Greece as Triaina 26 February 1965; stricken 1980
Scamp	United States Navy	Gato	fleet submarine	2,424	18 September 1942	Sunk 11 November 1944
Sceptre	Royal Navy	S (Third Group)	submarine	990	15 April 1943	Sold for scrap September 1949
Scirè	Regia Marina	Adua	coastal submarine	843	25 March 1938	Sunk 10 August 1942
Scorcher	Royal Navy	S (Third Group)	submarine	990	16 March 1945	Broken up 1962
Scorpion	United States Navy	Gato	fleet submarine	2,424	1 October 1942	Missing after 5 January 1944
Scotsman	Royal Navy	S (Third Group)	submarine	990	9 December 1944	Broken up November 1964
Sculpin	United States Navy	Sargo	fleet submarine	2,350	16 January 1939	Scuttled 19 November 1943
Scythian	Royal Navy	S (Third Group)	submarine	990	11 August 1944	Broken up August 1960
Sea Cat	United States Navy	Balao	fleet submarine	2,391	16 May 1944	Sold for scrap 18 May 1973
Sea Devil	Royal Navy	S (Third Group)	submarine	990	12 May 1945	Broken up 1966
Sea Devil	United States Navy	Balao	fleet submarine	2,391	24 May 1944	Sunk as target 24 November 1964
Sea Dog	United States Navy	Balao	fleet submarine	2,391	3 June 1944	Sold for scrap 18 May 1973
Sea Fox	United States Navy	Balao	fleet submarine	2,391	13 June 1944	Transferred to Turkey as Burakreis 14 December 1970; stricken 1996
Sea Leopard	United States Navy	Tench	fleet submarine	2,391	11 June 1945	Transferred to Brazil as Bahia 27 March 1973; sold for scrap 1998
Sea Nymph	Royal Navy	S (Third Group)	submarine	990	3 November 1942	Broken up 1948
Sea Owl	United States Navy	Balao	fleet submarine	2,391	17 July 1944	Sold for scrap 3 June 1971
Sea Poacher	United States Navy	Balao	fleet submarine	2,391	31 July 1944	Transferred to Peru as La Pedrera 1 July 1974; decommissioned 1995
Sea Robin	United States Navy	Balao	fleet submarine	2,391	7 August 1944	Sold for scrap 3 June 1971
Sea Rover	Royal Navy	S (Third Group)	submarine	990	7 July 1943	Paid off October 1949
Sea Scout	Royal Navy	S (Third Group)	submarine	990	19 June 1944	Sold for scrap 1965
Seadog	Royal Navy	S (Third Group)	submarine	814	24 September 1942	Paid off 24 December 1947
Seadragon	United States Navy	Sargo	fleet submarine	2,350	23 October 1939	Sold for scrap 2 July 1948
Seahorse	Royal Navy	S (First Group)	submarine	935	2 October 1933	Sunk 7 January 1940
Seahorse	United States Navy	Balao	fleet submarine	2,391	31 March 1943	Sold for scrap 4 December 1968
Seal	Royal Navy	Grampus	submarine	2,157	24 May 1939	Captured by Germany 5 May 1940; commissioned in Kriegsmarine as UB 30 November 1940; scuttled 3 May 1945; refloated and scrapped
Seal	United States Navy	Salmon	fleet submarine	2,198	30 April 1938	Scrapped 1956
Sealion	Royal Navy	S (Second Group)	submarine	960	16 March 1934	Scuttled 13 March 1945
Sealion (SS-195)	United States Navy	Sargo	fleet submarine	2,350	27 November 1939	Scuttled 25 December 1941
Sealion (SS-315)	United States Navy	Balao	fleet submarine	2,391	8 March 1944	Sunk as target 8 July 1978
Searaven	United States Navy	Sargo	fleet submarine	2,350	2 October 1939	Expended as target 11 September 1948
Seawolf	United States Navy	Sargo	fleet submarine	2,350	1 December 1939	Sunk by friendly fire 3 October 1944
Seawolf	Royal Navy	S (Second Group)	submarine	960	12 March 1936	Sold for scrap November 1945
Segundo	United States Navy	Balao	fleet submarine	2,391	9 May 1944	Sunk as target 8 August 1970
Selene	Royal Navy	S (Third Group)	submarine	990	14 July 1944	Sold for breaking up 1961
Sennet	United States Navy	Balao	fleet submarine	2,391	22 August 1944	Sold for scrap 15 June 1973
Sęp	Polish Navy	Orzeł	submarine	1,473	16 April 1939	Decommissioned 15 September 1969, scrapped 1972
Seraph	Royal Navy	S (Third Group)	submarine	990	27 June 1942	Paid off 25 October 1962
Serpente	Regia Marina	Argonauta	coastal submarine	1,080	12 November 1932	Scuttled 12 September 1943
Severn	Royal Navy	River	fleet submarine	2,680	12 January 1935	Sold for scrap 1946
Sfax	French Navy	Redoutable	cruiser submarine	1,968	7 September 1936	Sunk 19 December 1940
Shad	United States Navy	Balao	fleet submarine	2,391	12 June 1942	Sold for scrap 11 July 1960
Shakespeare	Royal Navy	S (Third Group)	submarine	990	10 July 1942	Paid off 14 July 1946
Shalimar	Royal Navy	S (Third Group)	submarine	990	22 April 1944	Sold for breaking up July 1950
Shark	Royal Navy	S (Second Group)	submarine	960	31 December 1934	Sunk 6 July 1940
Shark (SS-174)	United States Navy	Porpoise	fleet submarine	1,968	25 January 1936	Probably sunk 11 February 1942
Shark (SS-314)	United States Navy	Balao	fleet submarine	2,391	14 February 1944	Sunk 24 October 1944
Sibyl	Royal Navy	S (Third Group)	submarine	990	16 August 1942	Broken up 1948
Sickle	Royal Navy	S (Third Group)	submarine	990	1 December 1942	Probably sunk June 1944
Sidi Ferruch	French Navy	Redoutable	cruiser submarine	1,968	1 January 1939	Sunk 11 November 1942
Sidon	Royal Navy	S (Third Group)	submarine	990	23 November 1944	Sunk as target 14 June 1957
Silversides	United States Navy	Gato	fleet submarine	2,424	15 December 1941	Preserved 24 May 1973
Simoom	Royal Navy	S (Third Group)	submarine	990	30 December 1942	Sunk November 1943
Sinsamut	Royal Thai Navy	Matchanu	submarine	420	19 July 1938	Scrapped in 1952
Sirago	United States Navy	Tench	fleet submarine	2,414	13 August 1945	Sold for scrap 2 May 1973
Sirdar	Royal Navy	S (Third Group)	submarine	990	20 September 1943	Broken up 1965
Sirena	Regia Marina	Sirena	coastal submarine	837	2 October 1933	Scuttled 9 September 1943
Sirène	French Navy	Sirène	submarine	745	12 March 1927	Scuttled 27 November 1942
Skate	United States Navy	Balao	fleet submarine	2,391	15 April 1943	Sunk as target 5 October 1948
Skipjack	United States Navy	Salmon	fleet submarine	2,198	30 June 1938	Sunk as nuclear testing target July 1946, raised and expended as target August 1948
Sleuth	Royal Navy	S (Third Group)	submarine	990	8 October 1944	Broken up 1958
Smeli	Royal Yugoslav Navy; Regia Marina	Osvetnik	submarine	809	1 December 1928	Captured by the Italians in 1941, scuttled in 1943
Smeraldo	Regia Marina	Sirena	coastal submarine	837	29 November 1933	Lost ca. 25 September 1941
Snapper	United States Navy	Salmon	fleet submarine	2,198	15 December 1937	Scrapped 1948
Snapper	Royal Navy	S (Second Group)	submarine	960	25 October 1934	Sunk February 1941
Snook	United States Navy	Gato	fleet submarine	2,424	24 October 1942	Missing after 8 April 1945
Sokół	Polish Navy	U	submarine	730	19 January 1941	Transferred to United Kingdom as Urchin 27 July 1945; scrapped September 1949
Solent	Royal Navy	S (Third Group)	submarine	990	7 September 1944	Broken up 1961
Souffleur	French Navy	Requin	submarine	1,132	10 August 1926	Sunk 25 June 1941
Spadefish	United States Navy	Balao	fleet submarine	2,391	9 March 1944	Sold for scrap 17 October 1969
Sparide	Regia Marina	Flutto	submarine	1,093	7 August 1943	Scuttled 9 September 1943; refloated by Germany; renamed UIT-15; destroyed in port 4 September 1944
Spark	Royal Navy	S (Third Group)	submarine	990	28 December 1943	Broken up October 1950
Spartakovets	Soviet Navy	Dekabrist	submarine	1,354	12 October 1929	Scrapped after 18 January 1956
Spearfish	Royal Navy	S (Second Group)	submarine	960	11 December 1936	Sunk 1 August 1940
Spearfish	United States Navy	Sargo	fleet submarine	2,350	12 July 1939	Sold for scrap 19 May 1947
Spearhead	Royal Navy	S (Third Group)	submarine	990	21 December 1944	Sold to Portugal as Neptuno August 1948; scrapped 1967
Spidola	Latvian Naval Forces; Soviet Navy	Ronis	submarine	514	1927	Captured by Soviet Union 13 August 1940, scuttled 24 June 1941
Spikefish	United States Navy	Balao	fleet submarine	2,391	30 June 1944	Sunk as target 4 August 1964
Spirit	Royal Navy	S (Third Group)	submarine	990	25 October 1943	Broken up 1950
Spiteful	Royal Navy	S (Third Group)	submarine	990	6 October 1943	Loaned to France as Sirène 1952–1958; scrapped 1963
Splendid	Royal Navy	S (Third Group)	submarine	990	8 August 1942	Scuttled 21 April 1943
Sportsman	Royal Navy	S (Third Group)	submarine	990	21 December 1942	Transferred to the French Navy 8 July 1952
Spot	United States Navy	Balao	fleet submarine	2,391	3 August 1944	Transferred to Chile as Simpson 12 January 1962; discarded 1982
Springer	United States Navy	Balao	fleet submarine	2,391	18 October 1944	Transferred to Chile as Thomson 23 January 1961; sold for scrap 1 September 1972
Springer	Royal Navy	S (Third Group)	submarine	990	2 August 1945	Sold to Israel as Tanin 9 October 1958; discarded 1972
Spur	Royal Navy	S (Third Group)	submarine	990	18 February 1945	Sold to Portugal as Narval November 1948; sold for scrap 1 October 1969
Squalo	Regia Marina	Squalo	submarine	1,107	10 October 1931	Stricken 1 February 1948
Starfish	Royal Navy	S (First Group)	submarine	935	3 July 1933	Sunk 9 January 1940
Statesman	Royal Navy	S (Third Group)	submarine	990	13 December 1943	Loaned to France as Sultane 1952–1959; sold for scrap 3 January 1961
Steelhead	United States Navy	Gato	fleet submarine	2,424	7 December 1942	Sold for scrap 21 December 1960
Sterlet	Royal Navy	S (Second Group)	submarine	960	6 April 1938	Sunk 18 April 1940
Sterlet	United States Navy	Balao	fleet submarine	2,391	4 March 1944	Sunk as target 31 January 1969
Stickleback	United States Navy	Balao	fleet submarine	2,391	29 March 1945	Sunk in collision 29 May 1958
Stingray	United States Navy	Salmon	fleet submarine	2,198	15 March 1938	Scrapped 1946
Stoic	Royal Navy	S (Third Group)	submarine	990	29 June 1943	Sold July 1950
Stonehenge	Royal Navy	S (Third Group)	submarine	990	15 June 1943	Missing March 1944
Storm	Royal Navy	S (Third Group)	submarine	990	9 July 1943	Scrapped September 1949
Stratagem	Royal Navy	S (Third Group)	submarine	990	9 October 1943	Sunk 22 November 1944
Strongbow	Royal Navy	S (Third Group)	submarine	990	23 December 1943	Scrapped April 1946
Stubborn	Royal Navy	S (Third Group)	submarine	990	20 February 1943	Scuttled 30 April 1946
Sturdy	Royal Navy	S (Third Group)	submarine	990	29 December 1943	Scrapped 1958
Sturgeon	United States Navy	Salmon	fleet submarine	2,198	25 June 1938	Scrapped 1948
Sturgeon	Royal Navy	S (First Group)	submarine	935	15 December 1932	Paid off 17 November 1945
Stygian	Royal Navy	S (Third Group)	submarine	990	16 April 1944	Broken up July 1959
Subtle	Royal Navy	S (Third Group)	submarine	990	29 February 1944	Sold for scrapping 28 October 1949
Sunfish	Royal Navy	S (Second Group)	submarine	960	2 July 1937	Sunk 27 July 1944
Sunfish	United States Navy	Gato	fleet submarine	2,424	15 July 1942	Sold for scrap 15 December 1960
Supreme	Royal Navy	S (Third Group)	submarine	990	20 May 1944	Scrapped July 1950
Surcouf	French Navy; Free French Naval Forces		cruiser submarine	4,304	16 April 1934	Missing 18 February 1942
Surf	Royal Navy	S (Third Group)	submarine	990	18 March 1943	Scrapped July 1950
Swordfish	Royal Navy	S (First Group)	submarine	935	28 November 1932	Sunk 7 November 1940
Swordfish	United States Navy	Sargo	fleet submarine	2,350	22 July 1939	Lost 12 January 1945
Syrtis	Royal Navy	S (Third Group)	submarine	990	23 April 1943	Missing after 22 March 1944
Taciturn	Royal Navy	T	submarine	1,560	8 October 1944	Scrapped August 1971
Tactician	Royal Navy	T	submarine	1,560	29 November 1942	Scrapped December 1963
Taku	Royal Navy	T	submarine	1,575	3 January 1940	Sold for scrap November 1946
Talent	Royal Navy	T	submarine	1,560	27 July 1945	Sold for scrap 1 February 1970
Talisman	Royal Navy	T	submarine	1,575	29 June 1940	Sunk 17 September 1942
Tally-Ho	Royal Navy	T	submarine	1,560	12 April 1943	Scrapped February 1967
Tambor	United States Navy	Tambor	fleet submarine	2,370	3 June 1940	Sold for scrap 5 December 1959
Tang	United States Navy	Balao	fleet submarine	2,391	15 October 1943	Sunk 24 October 1944
Tantalus	Royal Navy	T	submarine	1,560	2 June 1943	Scrapped November 1950
Tantivy	Royal Navy	T	submarine	1,560	25 July 1943	Sunk as target 1951
Tapir	Royal Navy	T	submarine	1,560	30 December 1944	Loaned to the Netherlands as Zeehond 12 July 1948; returned 15 July 1953; scrapped December 1966
Tarpon	United States Navy	Porpoise	fleet submarine	1,968	12 March 1936	Sold for scrap 8 June 1957; foundered 26 August 1957
Tarpon	Royal Navy	T	submarine	1,575	8 March 1940	Sunk 14 April 1940
Taurus	Royal Navy	T	submarine	1,560	3 November 1942	Loaned to the Netherlands as Dolfijn 4 June 1948–7 December 1953; scrapped April 1960
Tautog	United States Navy	Tambor	fleet submarine	2,370	3 July 1940	Sold for scrap 1 July 1960
Tegualda	Chilean Navy	H	submarine	434	1917	Scrapped 1945
Telemachus	Royal Navy	T	submarine	1,560	25 October 1943	Sold for scrap 1 August 1961
Tembien	Regia Marina	Adua	coastal submarine	843	1 July 1938	Sunk 2 August 1941
Tempest	Royal Navy	T	submarine	1,575	6 December 1941	Sunk 13 February 1942
Templar	Royal Navy	T	submarine	1,560	15 February 1943	Sunk as target 1954; refloated 4 December 1958; scrapped July 1959
Tench	United States Navy	Tench	fleet submarine	2,416	6 October 1944	Sold to Peru for spare parts 16 September 1976
Terrapin	Royal Navy	T	submarine	1,560	22 January 1944	Scrapped June 1946
Tetrarch	Royal Navy	T	submarine	1,575	15 February 1940	Sunk 2 November 1941
Thames	Royal Navy	River	fleet submarine	2,680	26 February 1932	Missing July 1940
Thétis	French Navy	Circé	submarine	764	24 February 1928	Scuttled 27 November 1942; refloated; not repaired
Thetis	Royal Navy	T	submarine	1,575	26 October 1940	Sank during trial dive 1 June 1939; refloated and repaired; commissioned as HMS Thunderbolt 26 October 1940; sunk 14 March 1943
Thistle	Royal Navy	T	submarine	1,575	4 July 1939	Sunk 10 April 1940
Thorn	Royal Navy	T	submarine	1,575	26 August 1941	Sunk 6 August 1942
Thornback	United States Navy	Tench	fleet submarine	2,416	13 October 1944	Transferred to Turkey as Uluçalireis 1 July 1971; retired 2000; museum ship
Thorough	Royal Navy	T	submarine	1,560	1 March 1944	Scrapped June 1962
Thrasher	Royal Navy	T	submarine	1,575	14 May 1941	Sold for scrap 9 March 1947
Threadfin	United States Navy	Balao	fleet submarine	2,391	30 August 1944	Transferred to Turkey as Birinci İnönü 18 August 1972; decommissioned sometime after mid-1998
Thresher	United States Navy	Tambor	fleet submarine	2,370	27 August 1940	Sold for scrap 18 March 1948
Thule	Royal Navy	T	submarine	1,560	13 May 1944	Scrapped September 1962
Thunderbolt	Royal Navy	T	submarine	1,575	26 October 1940	Sunk 14 March 1943
Tigris	Royal Navy	T	submarine	1,575	20 June 1940	Sunk 27 February 1943
Tigrone	United States Navy	Tench	fleet submarine	2,416	25 October 1944	Sunk as target 25 October 1976
Tijgerhaai	Royal Netherlands Navy	T	submarine	1,560	28 March 1945	Sold for scrap 5 November 1965
Tilefish	United States Navy	Balao	fleet submarine	2,391	15 December 1943	Transferred to Venezuela as Carite 4 May 1960; decommissioned 28 January 1977
Tinosa	United States Navy	Gato	fleet submarine	2,424	15 January 1943	Scuttled November 1960
Tiptoe	Royal Navy	T	submarine	1,560	10 May 1944	Scrapped 1975
Tirante	United States Navy	Tench	fleet submarine	2,416	6 November 1944	Sold for scrap 21 March 1974
Tireless	Royal Navy	T	submarine	1,560	18 April 1945	Scrapped 1968
Tito Speri	Regia Marina	Mameli	submarine	993	20 August 1929	Stricken 1 February 1948
Topazio	Regia Marina	Sirena	coastal submarine	837	26 April 1934	Sunk 12 September 1943
Torbay	Royal Navy	T	submarine	1,575	14 January 1941	Scrapped March 1947
Toro	United States Navy	Tench	fleet submarine	2,414	8 December 1944	Sold for scrap April 1965
Torricelli	Regia Marina	Brin	submarine	1,380	7 May 1939	Sunk 23 June 1940
Torsk	United States Navy	Tench	fleet submarine	2,414	16 December 1944	Museum ship 26 September 1972
Totem	Royal Navy	T	submarine	1,560	9 January 1945	Sold to Israel 1965; commissioned as Dakar 10 November 1967; sank ca. 25 January 1968
Tradewind	Royal Navy	T	submarine	1,560	18 October 1943	Scrapped December 1955
Traveller	Royal Navy	T	submarine	1,575	10 April 1942	Sunk 4 December 1942
Trenchant	Royal Navy	T	submarine	1,560	26 February 1944	Sold for scrap 1 July 1963
Trepang	United States Navy	Balao	fleet submarine	2,391	22 May 1944	Sunk as target 16 September 1969
Trespasser	Royal Navy	T	submarine	1,560	25 September 1942	Scrapped September 1961
Triad	Royal Navy	T	submarine	1,575	16 September 1939	Sunk 15 October 1940
Tribune	Royal Navy	T	submarine	1,575	17 October 1939	Broken up November 1947
Tricheco	Regia Marina	Squalo	submarine	1,107	25 June 1931	Sunk 18 March 1942
Trident	Royal Navy	T	submarine	1,575	1 October 1939	Sold for scrap 17 February 1946
Trigger	United States Navy	Gato	fleet submarine	2,424	31 January 1942	Sunk 28 March 1945
Triton	Royal Navy	T	submarine	1,575	9 November 1938	Sunk 18 December 1940
Triton	United States Navy	Tambor	fleet submarine	2,370	15 August 1940	Sunk 15 March 1943
Tritone	Regia Marina	Flutto	submarine	1,093	10 October 1942	Scuttled 19 January 1943
Triumph	Royal Navy	T	submarine	1,575	2 May 1939	Sunk 14 January 1942
Trooper	Royal Navy	T	submarine	1,575	29 August 1942	Sunk 17 October 1943
Trout	United States Navy	Tambor	fleet submarine	2,370	15 November 1940	Sunk 29 February 1944
Truant	Royal Navy	T	submarine	1,575	31 October 1939	Sold for scrap 15 December 1945; wrecked under tow December 1946
Truculent	Royal Navy	T	submarine	1,560	31 December 1942	Sunk in collision 12 January 1950; refloated 14 March 1950; sold for scrap 8 May 1950
Trump	Royal Navy	T	submarine	1,560	25 May 1945	Sold to Israel as Dolphin 1968; scrapped 1977
Truncheon	Royal Navy	T	submarine	1,560	8 July 1944	Scrapped August 1971
Trusty	Royal Navy	T	submarine	1,575	30 July 1941	Scrapped July 1947
Trutta	United States Navy	Tench	fleet submarine	2,414	16 November 1944	Transferred to Turkey as Cerbe 1 July 1972; decommissioned 23 July 1999
Tudor	Royal Navy	T	submarine	1,560	16 January 1944	Scrapped September 1962
Tullibee	United States Navy	Gato	fleet submarine	2,424	15 February 1943	Sunk 26 March 1944
Tuna	Royal Navy	T	submarine	1,575	1 August 1940	Scrapped June 1946
Tuna	United States Navy	Tambor	fleet submarine	2,370	2 January 1941	Scuttled 24 September 1948
Tunny	United States Navy	Gato	fleet submarine	2,424	1 September 1942	Sunk as target 19 June 1970
Turbulent	Royal Navy	T	submarine	1,575	2 December 1941	Missing after 3 March 1943
Turchese	Regia Marina	Perla	coastal submarine	846	21 September 1936	Stricken 1 February 1948
Turpin	Royal Navy	T	submarine	1,560	18 December 1944	sold to Israel 1965; commissioned as Leviathan 1967; scrapped 1978
Turquoise	French Navy	Saphir	minelayer submarine	925	10 September 1930	Captured by Italy 8 December 1942; renamed FR 116; captured bv Germany and scuttled 8 September 1943
U-1	Kriegsmarine	Type IIA	coastal U-boat	298	29 June 1935	Sunk 6 April 1940
U-2	Kriegsmarine	Type IIA	coastal U-boat	298	25 July 1935	Sunk 8 April 1944
U-3	Kriegsmarine	Type IIA	coastal U-boat	298	6 September 1935	Stricken 1 August 1944, scrapped 1945
U-4	Kriegsmarine	Type IIA	coastal U-boat	298	17 August 1935	Stricken 1 August 1944, scrapped 1945
U-5	Kriegsmarine	Type IIA	coastal U-boat	298	31 August 1935	Sunk 19 March 1943
U-6	Kriegsmarine	Type IIA	coastal U-boat	298	7 September 1935	Scuttled May 1945
U-7	Kriegsmarine	Type IIB	coastal U-boat	323	18 July 1935	Sunk 18 February 1944
U-8	Kriegsmarine	Type IIB	coastal U-boat	323	5 August 1935	Scuttled 5 May 1945
U-9	Kriegsmarine	Type IIB	coastal U-boat	323	21 August 1935	Sunk 20 August 1944, raised and recommissioned by Soviet Union as TS-16 1945, scrapped 12 December 1946
U-10	Kriegsmarine	Type IIB	coastal U-boat	323	9 September 1935	Stricken and scrapped 1 August 1944
U-11	Kriegsmarine	Type IIB	coastal U-boat	323	21 September 1935	Scuttled 3 May 1945
U-12	Kriegsmarine	Type IIB	coastal U-boat	323	30 September 1935	Sunk 8 October 1939
U-13	Kriegsmarine	Type IIB	coastal U-boat	323	30 November 1935	Sunk 31 May 1940
U-14	Kriegsmarine	Type IIB	coastal U-boat	323	18 January 1936	Scuttled 5 May 1945
U-15	Kriegsmarine	Type IIB	coastal U-boat	323	7 March 1936	Sunk 30 January 1940
U-16	Kriegsmarine	Type IIB	coastal U-boat	323	16 May 1936	Sunk 25 October 1939
U-17	Kriegsmarine	Type IIB	coastal U-boat	323	3 December 1935	Scuttled 5 May 1945
U-18	Kriegsmarine	Type IIB	coastal U-boat	323	4 January 1936	Scuttled 25 August 1944
U-19	Kriegsmarine	Type IIB	coastal U-boat	323	16 January 1936	Scuttled 10 September 1944
U-20	Kriegsmarine	Type IIB	coastal U-boat	323	1 February 1936	Scuttled 10 September 1944
U-21	Kriegsmarine	Type IIB	coastal U-boat	323	3 August 1936	Scrapped February 1945
U-22	Kriegsmarine	Type IIB	coastal U-boat	323	20 August 1936	Missing 27 March 1940
U-23	Kriegsmarine	Type IIB	coastal U-boat	323	24 September 1936	Scuttled 10 September 1944
U-24	Kriegsmarine	Type IIB	coastal U-boat	323	10 October 1936	Scuttled 25 August 1944
U-25	Kriegsmarine	Type IA	U-boat	966	6 April 1936	Sunk 1 August 1940
U-26	Kriegsmarine	Type IA	U-boat	966	6 May 1936	Scuttled 1 July 1940
U-27	Kriegsmarine	Type VIIA	U-boat	733	12 August 1936	Sunk 20 September 1939
U-28	Kriegsmarine	Type VIIA	U-boat	733	12 September 1936	Sank accidentally 17 March 1944, stricken 4 August 1944
U-29	Kriegsmarine	Type VIIA	U-boat	733	16 November 1936	Scuttled 5 May 1945
U-30	Kriegsmarine	Type VIIA	U-boat	733	8 October 1936	Scuttled 4 May 1945
U-31	Kriegsmarine	Type VIIA	U-boat	733	28 December 1936	Sunk 2 November 1940
U-32	Kriegsmarine	Type VIIA	U-boat	733	15 April 1937	Sunk 30 October 1940
U-33	Kriegsmarine	Type VIIA	U-boat	733	25 July 1936	Sunk 12 February 1940
U-34	Kriegsmarine	Type VIIA	U-boat	733	12 September 1936	Sunk 5 August 1943
U-35	Kriegsmarine	Type VIIA	U-boat	733	3 November 1936	Scuttled 29 November 1939
U-36	Kriegsmarine	Type VIIA	U-boat	733	16 December 1936	Sunk 4 December 1939
U-37	Kriegsmarine	Type IXA	U-boat	1,135	4 August 1938	Scuttled 8 May 1945
U-38	Kriegsmarine	Type IXA	U-boat	1,135	24 October 1938	Scuttled 5 May 1945
U-39	Kriegsmarine	Type IXA	U-boat	1,135	10 December 1938	Sunk 14 September 1939
U-40	Kriegsmarine	Type IXA	U-boat	1,135	11 February 1939	Sunk 13 October 1939
U-41	Kriegsmarine	Type IXA	U-boat	1,135	22 April 1939	Sunk 5 February 1940
U-42	Kriegsmarine	Type IXA	U-boat	1,135	15 July 1939	Sunk 13 October 1939
U-43	Kriegsmarine	Type IXA	U-boat	1,135	26 August 1939	Sunk 30 July 1943
U-44	Kriegsmarine	Type IXA	U-boat	1,135	4 November 1939	Sunk 13 March 1940
U-45	Kriegsmarine	Type VIIB	U-boat	843	25 June 1938	Sunk 14 October 1939
U-46	Kriegsmarine	Type VIIB	U-boat	843	2 November 1938	Scuttled 5 May 1945
U-47	Kriegsmarine	Type VIIB	U-boat	843	17 December 1938	Missing 7 March 1941
U-48	Kriegsmarine	Type VIIB	U-boat	843	22 April 1939	Scuttled 3 May 1945
U-49	Kriegsmarine	Type VIIB	U-boat	843	12 August 1939	Sunk 15 April 1940
U-50	Kriegsmarine	Type VIIB	U-boat	843	12 December 1939	Sunk 6 April 1940
U-51	Kriegsmarine	Type VIIB	U-boat	843	6 August 1938	Sunk 20 August 1940
U-52	Kriegsmarine	Type VIIB	U-boat	843	4 February 1939	Scuttled 3 May 1945
U-53	Kriegsmarine	Type VIIB	U-boat	843	24 June 1939	Sunk 23 / 24 February 1940
U-54	Kriegsmarine	Type VIIB	U-boat	843	23 September 1939	Sunk 13 March 1940
U-55	Kriegsmarine	Type VIIB	U-boat	843	21 November 1939	Missing February 1940
U-56	Kriegsmarine	Type IIC	coastal U-boat	336	26 November 1938	Scuttled 3 May 1945
U-57	Kriegsmarine	Type IIC	coastal U-boat	336	29 December 1938	Scuttled 3 May 1945
U-58	Kriegsmarine	Type IIC	coastal U-boat	336	4 February 1939	Scuttled 3 May 1945
U-59	Kriegsmarine	Type IIC	coastal U-boat	336	4 March 1939	Scuttled 3 May 1945
U-60	Kriegsmarine	Type IIC	coastal U-boat	336	22 July 1939	Scuttled 5 May 1945
U-61	Kriegsmarine	Type IIC	coastal U-boat	336	12 August 1939	Scuttled 5 May 1945
U-62	Kriegsmarine	Type IIC	coastal U-boat	336	21 December 1939	Scuttled 5 May 1945
U-63	Kriegsmarine	Type IIC	coastal U-boat	336	18 January 1940	Sunk 25 February 1940
U-64	Kriegsmarine	Type IXB	U-boat	1,159	16 December 1939	Sunk 13 April 1940
U-65	Kriegsmarine	Type IXB	U-boat	1,159	15 February 1940	Sunk 28 April 1941
U-66	Kriegsmarine	Type IXC	U-boat	1,213	2 January 1941	Sunk 6 May 1944
U-67	Kriegsmarine	Type IXC	U-boat	1,213	22 January 1941	Sunk 16 July 1943
U-68	Kriegsmarine	Type IXC	U-boat	1,213	11 February 1941	Sunk 10 April 1944
U-69	Kriegsmarine	Type VIIC	U-boat	857	4 January 1941	Sunk 30 March 1945
U-70	Kriegsmarine	Type VIIC	U-boat	857	23 November 1940	Sunk 7 March 1941
U-71	Kriegsmarine	Type VIIC	U-boat	857	14 December 1940	Scuttled 2 May 1945
U-72	Kriegsmarine	Type VIIC	U-boat	857	4 January 1941	Sunk 30 March 1945
U-73	Kriegsmarine	Type VIIB	U-boat	843	30 September 1940	Sunk 16 December 1943
U-74	Kriegsmarine	Type VIIB	U-boat	843	31 October 1940	Sunk 2 May 1942
U-75	Kriegsmarine	Type VIIB	U-boat	843	19 December 1940	Sunk 28 December 1941
U-76	Kriegsmarine	Type VIIB	U-boat	843	9 December 1940	Sunk 5 April 1941
U-77	Kriegsmarine	Type VIIC	U-boat	857	18 January 1941	Scuttled 29 March 1943
U-78	Kriegsmarine	Type VIIC	U-boat	857	15 February 1941	Sunk 16 April 1945
U-79	Kriegsmarine	Type VIIC	U-boat	857	13 March 1941	Sunk 23 December 1941
U-80	Kriegsmarine	Type VIIC	U-boat	857	8 April 1941	Sunk 28 November 1944
U-81	Kriegsmarine	Type VIIC	U-boat	857	26 April 1941	Sunk 9 January 1944, raised 22 April 1944 and scrapped
U-82	Kriegsmarine	Type VIIC	U-boat	857	14 May 1941	Sunk 6 February 1942
U-83	Kriegsmarine	Type VIIB	U-boat	843	8 February 1941	Sunk 4 March 1943
U-84	Kriegsmarine	Type VIIB	U-boat	843	29 April 1941	Sunk 7 August 1943
U-85	Kriegsmarine	Type VIIB	U-boat	843	7 June 1941	Sunk 14 April 1942
U-86	Kriegsmarine	Type VIIB	U-boat	843	8 July 1941	Sunk 29 November 1943
U-87	Kriegsmarine	Type VIIB	U-boat	843	19 August 1941	Sunk 4 March 1943
U-88	Kriegsmarine	Type VIIC	U-boat	857	15 October 1941	Sunk 12 September 1942
U-89	Kriegsmarine	Type VIIC	U-boat	857	19 November 1941	Sunk 12 May 1943
U-90	Kriegsmarine	Type VIIC	U-boat	857	20 December 1941	Sunk 24 July 1942
U-91	Kriegsmarine	Type VIIC	U-boat	857	28 January 1942	Sunk 26 February 1944
U-92	Kriegsmarine	Type VIIC	U-boat	857	3 March 1942	Decommissioned 12 October 1944, scrapped 1944–1945
U-93	Kriegsmarine	Type VIIC	U-boat	857	30 July 1940	Sunk 15 January 1942
U-94	Kriegsmarine	Type VIIC	U-boat	857	10 August 1940	Sunk 28 August 1942
U-95	Kriegsmarine	Type VIIC	U-boat	857	31 August 1940	Sunk 28 November 1941
U-96	Kriegsmarine	Type VIIC	U-boat	857	14 September 1940	Sunk 30 March 1945
U-97	Kriegsmarine	Type VIIC	U-boat	857	28 September 1940	Sunk 16 June 1943
U-98	Kriegsmarine	Type VIIC	U-boat	857	12 October 1940	Sunk 15 November 1942
U-99	Kriegsmarine	Type VIIB	U-boat	843	18 April 1940	Scuttled 17 March 1941
U-100	Kriegsmarine	Type VIIB	U-boat	843	30 May 1940	Sunk 17 March 1941
U-101	Kriegsmarine	Type VIIB	U-boat	843	11 March 1940	Scuttled 3 May 1945
U-102	Kriegsmarine	Type VIIB	U-boat	843	27 April 1940	Sunk 1 July 1940
U-103	Kriegsmarine	Type IXB	U-boat	1,159	5 July 1940	Scuttled 3 May 1945
U-104	Kriegsmarine	Type IXB	U-boat	1,159	19 August 1940	Missing 28 November 1940
U-105	Kriegsmarine	Type IXB	U-boat	1,159	10 September 1940	Sunk 2 June 1943
U-106	Kriegsmarine	Type IXB	U-boat	1,159	24 September 1940	Sunk 2 August 1943
U-107	Kriegsmarine	Type IXB	U-boat	1,159	8 October 1940	Sunk 18 August 1944
U-108	Kriegsmarine	Type IXB	U-boat	1,159	22 October 1940	Sunk 11 April 1944
U-109	Kriegsmarine	Type IXB	U-boat	1,159	5 December 1940	Sunk 4 May 1943
U-110	Kriegsmarine	Type IXB	U-boat	1,159	21 November 1940	Captured by British destroyer 9 May 1941, sunk 10 May 1941
U-111	Kriegsmarine	Type IXB	U-boat	1,159	19 December 1940	Sunk 4 October 1941
U-116	Kriegsmarine	Type XB	minelayer U-boat	2,143	26 July 1941	Lost 6 October 1942
U-117	Kriegsmarine	Type XB	minelayer U-boat	2,143	25 October 1941	Sunk 7 August 1943
U-118	Kriegsmarine	Type XB	minelayer U-boat	2,143	6 December 1941	Sunk 12 June 1943
U-119	Kriegsmarine	Type XB	minelayer U-boat	2,143	2 April 1942	Sunk 24 June 1943
U-120	Kriegsmarine	Type IIB	coastal U-boat	323	20 April 1940	Scuttled 5 May 1945, raised and scrapped 1950
U-121	Kriegsmarine	Type IIB	coastal U-boat	323	28 May 1940	Scuttled 5 May 1945, raised and scrapped 1950
U-122	Kriegsmarine	Type IXB	U-boat	1,159	30 March 1940	Missing 22 June 1940
U-123	Kriegsmarine	Type IXB	U-boat	1,159	30 May 1940	Scuttled 19 August 1944, raised and repaired by France as Blaison post-war, decommissioned 18 August 1959
U-124	Kriegsmarine	Type IXB	U-boat	1,159	11 June 1940	Sunk 2 April 1943
U-125	Kriegsmarine	Type IXC	U-boat	1,232	3 March 1941	Sunk 6 May 1943
U-126	Kriegsmarine	Type IXC	U-boat	1,232	22 March 1941	Sunk 3 July 1943
U-127	Kriegsmarine	Type IXC	U-boat	1,232	24 April 1941	Sunk 15 December 1941
U-128	Kriegsmarine	Type IXC	U-boat	1,232	12 May 1941	Sunk 17 May 1943
U-129	Kriegsmarine	Type IXC	U-boat	1,232	21 May 1941	Scuttled 18 August 1944; refloated and scrapped 1946
U-130	Kriegsmarine	Type IXC	U-boat	1,232	11 June 1941	Sunk 12 March 1943
U-131	Kriegsmarine	Type IXC	U-boat	1,232	1 July 1941	Scuttled 17 December 1941
U-132	Kriegsmarine	Type VIIC	U-boat	857	29 May 1941	Sunk 4 November 1942
U-133	Kriegsmarine	Type VIIC	U-boat	857	5 July 1941	Sunk 14 March 1942
U-134	Kriegsmarine	Type VIIC	U-boat	857	26 July 1941	Sunk 26 July 1941
U-135	Kriegsmarine	Type VIIC	U-boat	857	16 August 1941	Sunk 15 July 1943
U-136	Kriegsmarine	Type VIIC	U-boat	857	30 August 1941	Sunk 11 July 1942
U-137	Kriegsmarine	Type IID	coastal U-boat	364	15 June 1940	Scuttled 5 May 1945
U-138	Kriegsmarine	Type IID	coastal U-boat	364	27 June 1940	Scuttled 18 June 1941
U-139	Kriegsmarine	Type IID	coastal U-boat	364	24 July 1940	Scuttled 5 May 1945
U-140	Kriegsmarine	Type IID	coastal U-boat	364	7 August 1940	Scuttled 5 May 1945
U-141	Kriegsmarine	Type IID	coastal U-boat	364	21 August 1940	Scuttled 5 May 1945
U-142	Kriegsmarine	Type IID	coastal U-boat	364	4 September 1940	Scuttled 5 May 1945
U-143	Kriegsmarine	Type IID	coastal U-boat	364	18 September 1940	Surrendered 5 May 1945; scuttled 22 December 1945
U-144	Kriegsmarine	Type IID	coastal U-boat	364	2 October 1940	Sunk 10 August 1941
U-145	Kriegsmarine	Type IID	coastal U-boat	364	16 October 1940	Surrendered 5 May 1945; scuttled 22 December 1945
U-146	Kriegsmarine	Type IID	coastal U-boat	364	30 October 1940	Scuttled 5 May 1945
U-147	Kriegsmarine	Type IID	coastal U-boat	364	16 November 1940	Sunk 2 June 1941
U-148	Kriegsmarine	Type IID	coastal U-boat	364	28 December 1940	Scuttled 5 May 1945
U-149	Kriegsmarine	Type IID	coastal U-boat	364	13 November 1940	Surrendered 5 May 1945; scuttled 21 December 1945
U-150	Kriegsmarine	Type IID	coastal U-boat	364	27 November 1940	Surrendered 5 May 1945; scuttled 21 December 1945
U-151	Kriegsmarine	Type IID	coastal U-boat	364	15 January 1941	Scuttled 5 May 1945
U-152	Kriegsmarine	Type IID	coastal U-boat	364	29 January 1941	Scuttled 5 May 1945
U-153	Kriegsmarine	Type IXC	U-boat	1,232	19 July 1941	Sunk 13 July 1942
U-154	Kriegsmarine	Type IXC	U-boat	1,232	2 August 1941	Sunk 3 July 1944
U-155	Kriegsmarine	Type IXC	U-boat	1,232	23 August 1941	Surrendered 5 May 1945; scuttled 21 December 1945
U-156	Kriegsmarine	Type IXC	U-boat	1,232	4 September 1941	Sunk 8 March 1943
U-157	Kriegsmarine	Type IXC	U-boat	1,232	15 September 1941	Sunk 13 June 1942
U-158	Kriegsmarine	Type IXC	U-boat	1,232	25 September 1941	Sunk 30 June 1942
U-159	Kriegsmarine	Type IXC	U-boat	1,232	4 October 1941	Sunk 28 July 1943
U-160	Kriegsmarine	Type IXC	U-boat	1,232	16 October 1941	Sunk 14 July 1943
U-161	Kriegsmarine	Type IXC	U-boat	1,232	8 July 1941	Sunk 27 September 1943
U-162	Kriegsmarine	Type IXC	U-boat	1,232	9 September 1941	Sunk 3 September 1942
U-163	Kriegsmarine	Type IXC	U-boat	1,232	21 October 1941	Sunk 13 March 1943
U-164	Kriegsmarine	Type IXC	U-boat	1,232	28 November 1941	Sunk 6 January 1943
U-165	Kriegsmarine	Type IXC	U-boat	1,232	3 February 1942	Sunk 27 September 1942
U-166	Kriegsmarine	Type IXC	U-boat	1,232	23 March 1942	Sunk 30 July 1942
U-167	Kriegsmarine	Type IXC/40	U-boat	1,237	4 July 1942	Scuttled 6 April 1943
U-168	Kriegsmarine	Type IXC/40	U-boat	1,237	10 September 1942	Sunk 6 October 1944
U-169	Kriegsmarine	Type IXC/40	U-boat	1,237	16 November 1942	Sunk 27 March 1943
U-170	Kriegsmarine	Type IXC/40	U-boat	1,237	19 January 1943	Surrendered 9 May 1945; scuttled 30 November 1945
U-171	Kriegsmarine	Type IXC	U-boat	1,232	25 October 1941	Sunk 9 October 1942
U-172	Kriegsmarine	Type IXC	U-boat	1,232	5 November 1941	Sunk 13 December 1943
U-173	Kriegsmarine	Type IXC	U-boat	1,232	15 November 1941	Sunk 16 November 1942
U-174	Kriegsmarine	Type IXC	U-boat	1,232	26 November 1941	Sunk 27 April 1943
U-175	Kriegsmarine	Type IXC	U-boat	1,232	5 December 1941	Sunk 17 April 1943
U-176	Kriegsmarine	Type IXC	U-boat	1,232	15 December 1941	Sunk 15 May 1943
U-177	Kriegsmarine	Type IXD2	U-boat	1,771	14 March 1942	Sunk 6 February 1944
U-178	Kriegsmarine	Type IXD2	U-boat	1,771	14 February 1942	Scuttled 25 August 1944
U-179	Kriegsmarine	Type IXD2	U-boat	1,771	7 March 1942	Sunk 8 October 1942
U-180	Kriegsmarine	Type IXD2	U-boat	1,771	16 May 1942	Sunk 23 August 1944
U-181	Kriegsmarine	Type IXD2	U-boat	1,771	9 May 1942	Seized by Japan 6 May 1945; commissioned as I-501; surrendered August 1945; scuttled 12 February 1946
U-182	Kriegsmarine	Type IXD2	U-boat	1,771	30 June 1942	Sunk 16 May 1943
U-183	Kriegsmarine	Type IXC/40	U-boat	1,237	1 April 1942	Sunk 23 April 1945
U-184	Kriegsmarine	Type IXC/40	U-boat	1,237	29 May 1942	Missing after 21 November 1942
U-185	Kriegsmarine	Type IXC/40	U-boat	1,237	13 June 1942	Sunk 24 August 1943
U-186	Kriegsmarine	Type IXC/40	U-boat	1,237	10 July 1942	Sunk 12 May 1943
U-187	Kriegsmarine	Type IXC/40	U-boat	1,237	23 July 1942	Sunk 4 February 1943
U-188	Kriegsmarine	Type IXC/40	U-boat	1,237	5 August 1942	Scuttled 25 August 1944; refloated and scrapped 1947
U-189	Kriegsmarine	Type IXC/40	U-boat	1,237	15 August 1942	Sunk 23 April 1943
U-190	Kriegsmarine; Royal Canadian Navy	Type IXC/40	U-boat	1,257	24 September 1942	Surrendered to Royal Canadian Navy (RCN) 11 May 1945; commissioned in RCN 19 May 1945; paid off 24 July 1947; scuttled 21 October 1947
U-191	Kriegsmarine	Type IXC/40	U-boat	1,237	20 October 1942	Sunk 23 April 1943
U-192	Kriegsmarine	Type IXC/40	U-boat	1,237	16 November 1942	Sunk 6 May 1943
U-193	Kriegsmarine	Type IXC/40	U-boat	1,237	10 December 1942	Missing after 24 April 1944
U-194	Kriegsmarine	Type IXC/40	U-boat	1,237	8 January 1943	Sunk 24 June 1943
U-195	Kriegsmarine	Type IXD1	U-boat	1,771	5 September 1942	Seized by Japan 5 May 1945; commissioned as I-506; surrendered August 1945; scuttled 15 February 1946; refloated and scrapped 1947
U-196	Kriegsmarine	Type IXD2	U-boat	1,771	11 September 1942	Missing after 12 December 1944
U-197	Kriegsmarine	Type IXD2	U-boat	1,771	10 October 1942	Sunk 20 August 1943
U-198	Kriegsmarine	Type IXD2	U-boat	1,771	3 November 1942	Sunk 12 August 1944
U-199	Kriegsmarine	Type IXD2	U-boat	1,771	28 November 1942	Sunk 31 July 1943
U-200	Kriegsmarine	Type IXD2	U-boat	1,771	22 December 1942	Sunk 24 June 1943
U-201	Kriegsmarine	Type VIIC	U-boat	857	25 January 1941	Sunk 17 February 1943
U-202	Kriegsmarine	Type VIIC	U-boat	857	22 March 1941	Sunk 2 June 1943
U-203	Kriegsmarine	Type VIIC	U-boat	857	18 February 1941	Sunk 25 April 1943
U-204	Kriegsmarine	Type VIIC	U-boat	857	8 March 1941	Sunk 19 October 1941
U-205	Kriegsmarine	Type VIIC	U-boat	857	3 May 1941	Sunk 17 February 1943
U-206	Kriegsmarine	Type VIIC	U-boat	857	17 May 1941	Missing after ca. 30 November 1941
U-207	Kriegsmarine	Type VIIC	U-boat	857	7 June 1941	Sunk 11 September 1941
U-208	Kriegsmarine	Type VIIC	U-boat	857	5 July 1941	Sunk 7 December 1941
U-209	Kriegsmarine	Type VIIC	U-boat	857	11 October 1941	Missing after 7 May 1943
U-210	Kriegsmarine	Type VIIC	U-boat	857	21 February 1942	Sunk 6 August 1942
U-211	Kriegsmarine	Type VIIC	U-boat	857	7 March 1942	Sunk 19 November 1943
U-212	Kriegsmarine	Type VIIC	U-boat	857	25 April 1942	Sunk 21 July 1944
U-213	Kriegsmarine	Type VIID	U-boat	1,060	30 August 1941	Sunk 31 July 1942
U-214	Kriegsmarine	Type VIID	U-boat	1,060	1 November 1941	Sunk 26 July 1944
U-215	Kriegsmarine	Type VIID	U-boat	1,060	22 November 1941	Sunk 3 July 1942
U-216	Kriegsmarine	Type VIID	U-boat	1,060	15 December 1941	Sunk 20 October 1942
U-217	Kriegsmarine	Type VIID	U-boat	1,060	31 January 1942	Sunk 5 June 1943
U-218	Kriegsmarine	Type VIID	U-boat	1,060	24 January 1942	Surrendered 12 May 1945; scuttled 4 December 1945
U-219	Kriegsmarine	Type XB	U-boat minelayer	2,143	12 December 1942	Seized by Japan 5 May 1945; commissioned as I-505; surrendered August 1945; scuttled 3 February 1946
U-220	Kriegsmarine	Type XB	U-boat minelayer	2,143	27 March 1943	Sunk 28 October 1943
U-221	Kriegsmarine	Type VIIC	U-boat	857	9 May 1942	Sunk 27 September 1943
U-222	Kriegsmarine	Type VIIC	U-boat	857	23 May 1942	Sunk in collision 2 September 1942
U-223	Kriegsmarine	Type VIIC	U-boat	857	6 June 1942	Sunk 30 March 1944
U-224	Kriegsmarine	Type VIIC	U-boat	857	20 June 1942	Sunk 13 January 1943
U-225	Kriegsmarine	Type VIIC	U-boat	857	11 July 1942	Sunk 22 February 1943
U-226	Kriegsmarine	Type VIIC	U-boat	857	1 August 1942	Sunk 6 November 1943
U-227	Kriegsmarine	Type VIIC	U-boat	857	22 August 1942	Sunk 30 April 1943
U-228	Kriegsmarine	Type VIIC	U-boat	857	12 September 1942	Stricken 5 October 1944; scrapped
U-229	Kriegsmarine	Type VIIC	U-boat	857	3 October 1942	Sunk 22 September 1943
U-230	Kriegsmarine	Type VIIC	U-boat	857	24 October 1942	Scuttled 21 August 1944
U-231	Kriegsmarine	Type VIIC	U-boat	857	14 November 1942	Sunk 13 January 1944
U-232	Kriegsmarine	Type VIIC	U-boat	857	28 November 1942	Sunk 9 July 1943
U-233	Kriegsmarine	Type XB	U-boat minelayer	2,143	22 September 1943	Sunk 5 July 1944
U-234	Kriegsmarine	Type XB	U-boat minelayer	2,143	2 March 1944	Surrendered 14 May 1945; sunk as target 20 November 1947
U-235	Kriegsmarine	Type VIIC	U-boat	857	19 December 1942	Sunk 14 April 1945
U-236	Kriegsmarine	Type VIIC	U-boat	857	9 January 1943	Scuttled 5 May 1945
U-237	Kriegsmarine	Type VIIC	U-boat	857	30 January 1943	Sunk 4 April 1945
U-238	Kriegsmarine	Type VIIC	U-boat	857	20 February 1943	Sunk 9 February 1944
U-239	Kriegsmarine	Type VIIC	U-boat	857	13 March 1943	Scrapped 1944
U-240	Kriegsmarine	Type VIIC	U-boat	857	3 April 1943	Missing after 15 May 1944
U-241	Kriegsmarine	Type VIIC	U-boat	857	24 July 1943	Sunk 18 May 1944
U-242	Kriegsmarine	Type VIIC	U-boat	857	14 August 1943	Sunk 5 April 1945
U-243	Kriegsmarine	Type VIIC	U-boat	857	2 October 1943	Sunk 8 July 1944
U-244	Kriegsmarine	Type VIIC	U-boat	857	9 October 1943	Surrendered 14 May 1945; sank under tow the same day
U-244	Kriegsmarine	Type VIIC	U-boat	857	18 December 1943	Surrendered 9 May 1945; scuttled 7 December 1945
U-245	Kriegsmarine	Type VIIC	U-boat	857	18 December 1943	Surrendered 9 May 1945; scuttled 7 December 1945
U-246	Kriegsmarine	Type VIIC	U-boat	857	11 January 1944	Sunk 17 March 1945
U-247	Kriegsmarine	Type VIIC	U-boat	857	23 October 1943	Sunk 1 September 1944
U-248	Kriegsmarine	Type VIIC	U-boat	857	6 November 1943	Sunk 16 January 1945
U-249	Kriegsmarine	Type VIIC	U-boat	857	20 November 1943	Surrendered 10 May 1945: scuttled 13 December 1945
U-250	Kriegsmarine	Type VIIC	U-boat	857	12 December 1943	Sunk 30 July 1944; refloated by Soviet Union; in Soviet Navy as TS-14; scrapped
U-251	Kriegsmarine	Type VIIC	U-boat	857	20 September 1941	Sunk 19 April 1945
U-252	Kriegsmarine	Type VIIC	U-boat	857	4 October 1941	Sunk 14 April 1942
U-253	Kriegsmarine	Type VIIC	U-boat	857	21 October 1941	Sunk 25 September 1942
U-254	Kriegsmarine	Type VIIC	U-boat	857	8 November 1941	Sunk in collision 8 December 1942
U-255	Kriegsmarine	Type VIIC	U-boat	857	29 November 1941	Surrendered 17 May 1945; scuttled 13 December 1945
U-256	Kriegsmarine	Type VIIC	U-boat	857	18 December 1941	Captured May 1945; scrapped
U-257	Kriegsmarine	Type VIIC	U-boat	857	14 January 1942	Sunk 24 February 1944
U-258	Kriegsmarine	Type VIIC	U-boat	857	4 February 1942	Sunk 20 May 1943
U-259	Kriegsmarine	Type VIIC	U-boat	857	18 February 1942	Sunk 15 November 1942
U-260	Kriegsmarine	Type VIIC	U-boat	857	14 March 1942	Scuttled 12 March 1945
U-261	Kriegsmarine	Type VIIC	U-boat	857	28 March 1942	Sunk 15 September 1942
U-262	Kriegsmarine	Type VIIC	U-boat	857	28 March 1942	Stricken 2 April 1945; scrapped 1947
U-263	Kriegsmarine	Type VIIC	U-boat	857	6 May 1942	Sank in diving accident 20 January 1944
U-264	Kriegsmarine	Type VIIC	U-boat	857	22 May 1942	Sunk 19 February 1944
U-265	Kriegsmarine	Type VIIC	U-boat	857	6 June 1942	Sunk 3 February 1943
U-266	Kriegsmarine	Type VIIC	U-boat	857	24 June 1942	Sunk 15 May 1943
U-267	Kriegsmarine	Type VIIC	U-boat	857	11 July 1942	Scuttled 5 May 1945; refloated and scrapped
U-268	Kriegsmarine	Type VIIC	U-boat	857	29 July 1942	Sunk 19 February 1943
U-269	Kriegsmarine	Type VIIC	U-boat	857	19 August 1942	Sunk 25 June 1944
U-270	Kriegsmarine	Type VIIC	U-boat	857	5 September 1942	Sunk 13 August 1944
U-271	Kriegsmarine	Type VIIC	U-boat	857	23 September 1942	Sunk 28 January 1944
U-272	Kriegsmarine	Type VIIC	U-boat	857	7 October 1942	Sunk in collision 12 November 1942
U-273	Kriegsmarine	Type VIIC	U-boat	857	21 October 1942	Sunk 19 May 1943
U-274	Kriegsmarine	Type VIIC	U-boat	857	7 November 1942	Sunk 23 October 1943
U-275	Kriegsmarine	Type VIIC	U-boat	857	25 November 1942	Sunk 10 March 1945
U-276	Kriegsmarine	Type VIIC	U-boat	857	9 December 1942	Stricken 29 September 1944; sunk 3 May 1945
U-277	Kriegsmarine	Type VIIC	U-boat	857	21 December 1942	Sunk 1 May 1944
U-278	Kriegsmarine	Type VIIC	U-boat	857	16 January 1943	Surrendered 9 May 1945; scuttled 31 December 1945
U-279	Kriegsmarine	Type VIIC	U-boat	857	3 February 1943	Sunk 4 October 1943
U-280	Kriegsmarine	Type VIIC	U-boat	857	13 February 1943	Sunk 16 November 1943
U-281	Kriegsmarine	Type VIIC	U-boat	857	27 February 1943	Surrendered 9 May 1945; scuttled 30 November 1945
U-282	Kriegsmarine	Type VIIC	U-boat	857	13 March 1943	Sunk 29 October 1943
U-283	Kriegsmarine	Type VIIC	U-boat	857	31 March 1943	Sunk 11 February 1944
U-284	Kriegsmarine	Type VIIC	U-boat	857	14 April 1943	Scuttled 21 December 1943
U-285	Kriegsmarine	Type VIIC	U-boat	857	15 May 1943	Sunk 15 April 1945
U-286	Kriegsmarine	Type VIIC	U-boat	857	5 June 1943	Sunk 29 April 1945
U-287	Kriegsmarine	Type VIIC	U-boat	857	22 September 1943	Scuttled 16 May 1945
U-288	Kriegsmarine	Type VIIC	U-boat	857	26 June 1943	Sunk 3 April 1944
U-289	Kriegsmarine	Type VIIC	U-boat	857	10 July 1943	Sunk 31 May 1944
U-290	Kriegsmarine	Type VIIC	U-boat	857	24 July 1943	Scuttled 5 May 1945
U-291	Kriegsmarine	Type VIIC	U-boat	857	4 August 1943	Surrendered 5 May 1945; scuttled 20 December 1945
U-292	Kriegsmarine	Type VIIC/41	U-boat	846	25 August 1943	Sunk 27 May 1944
U-293	Kriegsmarine	Type VIIC/41	U-boat	846	8 September 1943	Surrendered 11 May 1945; scuttled 13 December 1945
U-294	Kriegsmarine	Type VIIC/41	U-boat	846	4 October 1943	Surrendered 9 May 1945; scuttled 31 December 1945
U-295	Kriegsmarine	Type VIIC/41	U-boat	846	20 October 1943	Surrendered 9 May 1945; scuttled 17 December 1945
U-296	Kriegsmarine	Type VIIC/41	U-boat	846	3 November 1943	Missing March 1945
U-297	Kriegsmarine	Type VIIC/41	U-boat	846	17 November 1943	Sunk 6 December 1944
U-298	Kriegsmarine	Type VIIC/41	U-boat	846	1 December 1943	Surrendered 9 May 1945; scuttled 29 November 1945
U-299	Kriegsmarine	Type VIIC/41	U-boat	846	15 December 1943	Surrendered 9 May 1945; scuttled 4 December 1945
U-300	Kriegsmarine	Type VIIC/41	U-boat	846	29 December 1943	Sunk 22 February 1945
U-301	Kriegsmarine	Type VIIC	U-boat	857	9 May 1942	Sunk 21 January 1943
U-302	Kriegsmarine	Type VIIC	U-boat	857	16 June 1942	Sunk 6 April 1944
U-303	Kriegsmarine	Type VIIC	U-boat	857	7 July 1942	Sunk 21 May 1943
U-304	Kriegsmarine	Type VIIC	U-boat	857	5 August 1942	Sunk 28 May 1943
U-305	Kriegsmarine	Type VIIC	U-boat	857	17 September 1942	Sunk 16 January 1944
U-306	Kriegsmarine	Type VIIC	U-boat	857	21 October 1942	Sunk 31 October 1943
U-307	Kriegsmarine	Type VIIC	U-boat	857	18 November 1942	Sunk 29 April 1945
U-308	Kriegsmarine	Type VIIC	U-boat	857	23 December 1942	Sunk 4 June 1943
U-309	Kriegsmarine	Type VIIC	U-boat	857	27 January 1943	Sunk 16 February 1945
U-310	Kriegsmarine	Type VIIC	U-boat	857	24 February 1943	Surrendered 9 May 1945; Scrapped March 1947
U-311	Kriegsmarine	Type VIIC	U-boat	857	23 March 1943	Sunk 22 April 1944
U-312	Kriegsmarine	Type VIIC	U-boat	857	21 April 1943	Surrendered 9 May 1945; scuttled 29 November 1945
U-313	Kriegsmarine	Type VIIC	U-boat	857	20 May 1943	Surrendered 9 May 1945; scuttled 27 December 1945
U-314	Kriegsmarine	Type VIIC	U-boat	857	10 June 1943	Sunk 30 January 1944
U-315	Kriegsmarine	Type VIIC	U-boat	857	10 July 1943	Surrendered 9 May 1945; Scrapped March 1947
U-316	Kriegsmarine	Type VIIC	U-boat	857	5 August 1943	Scuttled 2 May 1945
U-317	Kriegsmarine	Type VIIC/41	U-boat	846	23 October 1943	Sunk 26 June 1944
U-318	Kriegsmarine	Type VIIC/41	U-boat	846	13 November 1943	Surrendered 9 May 1945; scuttled 21 December 1945
U-319	Kriegsmarine	Type VIIC/41	U-boat	846	4 December 1943	Sunk 15 July 1944
U-320	Kriegsmarine	Type VIIC/41	U-boat	846	30 December 1943	Scuttled 8 May 1945
U-321	Kriegsmarine	Type VIIC/41	U-boat	846	20 January 1944	Sunk 2 April 1945
U-322	Kriegsmarine	Type VIIC/41	U-boat	846	5 February 1944	Sunk 29 December 1944
U-323	Kriegsmarine	Type VIIC/41	U-boat	846	2 March 1944	Scuttled 5 May 1945
U-324	Kriegsmarine	Type VIIC/41	U-boat	846	5 April 1944	Surrendered 9 May 1945; Scrapped 1947
U-325	Kriegsmarine	Type VIIC/41	U-boat	846	6 May 1944	Sunk 30 April 1945
U-326	Kriegsmarine	Type VIIC/41	U-boat	846	6 June 1944	Sunk 30 April 1945
U-327	Kriegsmarine	Type VIIC/41	U-boat	846	18 July 1944	Sunk 3 February 1945
U-328	Kriegsmarine	Type VIIC/41	U-boat	846	19 September 1944	Surrendered 9 May 1945; scuttled 30 November 1945
U-331	Kriegsmarine	Type VIIC	U-boat	857	31 March 1941	Sunk 17 November 1942
U-332	Kriegsmarine	Type VIIC	U-boat	857	7 June 1941	Sunk 29 April 1943
U-333	Kriegsmarine	Type VIIC	U-boat	857	25 August 1941	Sunk 31 July 1944
U-334	Kriegsmarine	Type VIIC	U-boat	857	9 October 1941	Sunk 14 June 1943
U-335	Kriegsmarine	Type VIIC	U-boat	857	17 December 1941	Sunk 3 August 1942
U-336	Kriegsmarine	Type VIIC	U-boat	857	14 February 1942	Sunk 5 October 1943
U-337	Kriegsmarine	Type VIIC	U-boat	857	6 May 1942	Missing after 3 January 1943
U-338	Kriegsmarine	Type VIIC	U-boat	857	25 June 1942	Sunk 20 September 1943
U-339	Kriegsmarine	Type VIIC	U-boat	857	25 August 1942	Scuttled 5 May 1945
U-340	Kriegsmarine	Type VIIC	U-boat	857	16 October 1942	Sunk 2 November 1943
U-341	Kriegsmarine	Type VIIC	U-boat	857	28 November 1942	Sunk 19 September 1943
U-342	Kriegsmarine	Type VIIC	U-boat	857	12 January 1943	Sunk 17 April 1944
U-343	Kriegsmarine	Type VIIC	U-boat	857	18 February 1943	Sunk 10 March 1944
U-344	Kriegsmarine	Type VIIC	U-boat	857	26 March 1943	Sunk 22 August 1944
U-345	Kriegsmarine	Type VIIC	U-boat	857	4 May 1943	Decommissioned 23 December 1943; surrendered May 1945; sunk December 1945
U-346	Kriegsmarine	Type VIIC	U-boat	857	7 June 1943	Sank in diving accident 20 September 1943
U-347	Kriegsmarine	Type VIIC	U-boat	857	7 July 1943	Sunk 17 July 1944
U-348	Kriegsmarine	Type VIIC	U-boat	857	10 August 1943	Sunk 30 March 1945
U-349	Kriegsmarine	Type VIIC	U-boat	857	8 September 1943	Scuttled 5 May 1945; scrapped 1948
U-350	Kriegsmarine	Type VIIC	U-boat	857	7 October 1943	Sunk 30 March 1945
U-351	Kriegsmarine	Type VIIC	U-boat	857	20 June 1941	Scuttled 5 May 1945; scrapped 1948
U-352	Kriegsmarine	Type VIIC	U-boat	857	28 August 1941	Sunk 9 May 1942
U-353	Kriegsmarine	Type VIIC	U-boat	857	31 March 1942	Sunk 16 October 1942
U-354	Kriegsmarine	Type VIIC	U-boat	857	22 April 1942	Sunk 24 August 1944
U-355	Kriegsmarine	Type VIIC	U-boat	857	29 October 1941	Missing after 1 April 1944
U-356	Kriegsmarine	Type VIIC	U-boat	857	20 December 1941	Sunk 27 December 1942
U-357	Kriegsmarine	Type VIIC	U-boat	857	18 June 1942	Sunk 26 December 1942
U-358	Kriegsmarine	Type VIIC	U-boat	857	15 August 1942	Sunk 1 March 1944
U-359	Kriegsmarine	Type VIIC	U-boat	857	5 October 1942	Sunk 26 July 1943
U-360	Kriegsmarine	Type VIIC	U-boat	857	12 November 1942	Sunk 2 April 1944
U-361	Kriegsmarine	Type VIIC	U-boat	857	18 December 1942	Sunk 17 July 1944
U-362	Kriegsmarine	Type VIIC	U-boat	857	4 February 1943	Sunk 5 September 1944
U-363	Kriegsmarine	Type VIIC	U-boat	857	18 March 1943	Surrendered 9 May 1945; scuttled 31 December 1945
U-364	Kriegsmarine	Type VIIC	U-boat	857	3 May 1943	Sunk 29 January 1944
U-365	Kriegsmarine	Type VIIC	U-boat	857	8 June 1943	Sunk 13 December 1944
U-366	Kriegsmarine	Type VIIC	U-boat	857	16 July 1943	Sunk 5 March 1944
U-367	Kriegsmarine	Type VIIC	U-boat	857	27 August 1943	Sunk 15 March 1945
U-368	Kriegsmarine	Type VIIC	U-boat	857	7 January 1944	Surrendered 5 May 1945; scuttled 17 December 1945
U-369	Kriegsmarine	Type VIIC	U-boat	857	15 October 1943	Surrendered 9 May 1945; scuttled 30 November 1945
U-370	Kriegsmarine	Type VIIC	U-boat	857	15 October 1943	Scuttled 5 May 1945
U-371	Kriegsmarine	Type VIIC	U-boat	857	15 March 1941	Sunk 4 May 1944
U-372	Kriegsmarine	Type VIIC	U-boat	857	19 April 1941	Sunk 4 August 1942
U-373	Kriegsmarine	Type VIIC	U-boat	857	22 May 1941	Sunk 8 June 1944
U-374	Kriegsmarine	Type VIIC	U-boat	857	21 June 1941	Sunk 12 January 1942
U-375	Kriegsmarine	Type VIIC	U-boat	857	19 July 1941	Missing after 25 July 1943
U-376	Kriegsmarine	Type VIIC	U-boat	857	21 August 1941	Missing after 7 April 1943
U-377	Kriegsmarine	Type VIIC	U-boat	857	21 August 1941	Sunk 17 January 1944
U-378	Kriegsmarine	Type VIIC	U-boat	857	30 October 1941	Sunk 20 October 1943
U-379	Kriegsmarine	Type VIIC	U-boat	857	29 November 1941	Sunk 8 August 1942
U-380	Kriegsmarine	Type VIIC	U-boat	857	22 December 1941	Sunk 11 March 1944
U-381	Kriegsmarine	Type VIIC	U-boat	857	25 February 1942	Missing after 10 May 1943
U-382	Kriegsmarine	Type VIIC	U-boat	857	25 April 1942	Scuttled 5 May 1945
U-383	Kriegsmarine	Type VIIC	U-boat	857	6 June 1942	Sunk 1 August 1943
U-384	Kriegsmarine	Type VIIC	U-boat	857	18 July 1942	Sunk 19 March 1943
U-385	Kriegsmarine	Type VIIC	U-boat	857	29 August 1942	Sunk 11 August 1944
U-386	Kriegsmarine	Type VIIC	U-boat	857	10 October 1942	Sunk 19 February 1944
U-387	Kriegsmarine	Type VIIC	U-boat	857	24 November 1942	Sunk 9 December 1944
U-388	Kriegsmarine	Type VIIC	U-boat	857	31 December 1942	Sunk 20 June 1943
U-389	Kriegsmarine	Type VIIC	U-boat	857	6 February 1943	Sunk 4 October 1943
U-390	Kriegsmarine	Type VIIC	U-boat	857	13 March 1943	Sunk 5 July 1944
U-391	Kriegsmarine	Type VIIC	U-boat	857	24 April 1943	Sunk 13 December 1943
U-392	Kriegsmarine	Type VIIC	U-boat	857	29 May 1943	Sunk 16 March 1944
U-393	Kriegsmarine	Type VIIC	U-boat	857	3 July 1943	Scuttled 5 May 1945
U-394	Kriegsmarine	Type VIIC	U-boat	857	7 August 1943	Sunk 2 September 1944
U-396	Kriegsmarine	Type VIIC	U-boat	857	16 October 1943	Missing after 11 April 1945
U-397	Kriegsmarine	Type VIIC	U-boat	857	20 November 1943	Scuttled 5 May 1945
U-398	Kriegsmarine	Type VIIC	U-boat	857	8 December 1943	Missing after 17 April 1945
U-399	Kriegsmarine	Type VIIC	U-boat	857	22 January 1944	Sunk 26 March 1945
U-400	Kriegsmarine	Type VIIC	U-boat	857	18 March 1944	Sunk 15 December 1944
U-401	Kriegsmarine	Type VIIC	U-boat	857	10 April 1941	Sunk 3 August 1941
U-402	Kriegsmarine	Type VIIC	U-boat	857	21 May 1941	Sunk 13 October 1943
U-403	Kriegsmarine	Type VIIC	U-boat	857	25 June 1941	Sunk 18 August 1943
U-404	Kriegsmarine	Type VIIC	U-boat	857	6 August 1941	Sunk 28 July 1943
U-405	Kriegsmarine	Type VIIC	U-boat	857	17 September 1941	Sunk 1 November 1943
U-406	Kriegsmarine	Type VIIC	U-boat	857	22 October 1941	Sunk 18 February 1944
U-407	Kriegsmarine	Type VIIC	U-boat	857	18 December 1941	Sunk 19 September 1944
U-408	Kriegsmarine	Type VIIC	U-boat	857	19 November 1941	Sunk 5 November 1942
U-409	Kriegsmarine	Type VIIC	U-boat	857	21 January 1942	Sunk 12 July 1943
U-410	Kriegsmarine	Type VIIC	U-boat	857	23 February 1942	Sunk 11 March 1944
U-411	Kriegsmarine	Type VIIC	U-boat	857	18 March 1942	Sunk 13 November 1942
U-412	Kriegsmarine	Type VIIC	U-boat	857	29 April 1942	Sunk 22 October 1942
U-413	Kriegsmarine	Type VIIC	U-boat	857	3 June 1942	Sunk 20 August 1944
U-414	Kriegsmarine	Type VIIC	U-boat	857	1 July 1942	Sunk 25 May 1943
U-415	Kriegsmarine	Type VIIC	U-boat	857	5 August 1942	Sunk 14 July 1944
U-416	Kriegsmarine	Type VIIC	U-boat	857	4 November 1942	Sunk in collision 12 December 1944
U-417	Kriegsmarine	Type VIIC	U-boat	857	26 September 1942	Sunk 11 June 1943
U-418	Kriegsmarine	Type VIIC	U-boat	857	21 October 1942	Sunk 30 May 1943
U-419	Kriegsmarine	Type VIIC	U-boat	857	18 November 1942	Sunk 8 October 1943
U-420	Kriegsmarine	Type VIIC	U-boat	857	16 December 1942	Missing after 20 October 1943
U-421	Kriegsmarine	Type VIIC	U-boat	857	13 January 1943	Sunk 29 April 1944
U-422	Kriegsmarine	Type VIIC	U-boat	857	10 February 1943	Sunk 4 October 1943
U-423	Kriegsmarine	Type VIIC	U-boat	857	3 March 1943	Sunk 17 June 1944
U-424	Kriegsmarine	Type VIIC	U-boat	857	7 April 1943	Sunk 11 February 1944
U-425	Kriegsmarine	Type VIIC	U-boat	857	21 April 1943	Sunk 17 February 1945
U-426	Kriegsmarine	Type VIIC	U-boat	857	12 May 1943	Sunk 8 January 1944
U-427	Kriegsmarine	Type VIIC	U-boat	857	2 June 1943	Surrendered 9 May 1945; scuttled 21 December 1945
U-428	Kriegsmarine	Type VIIC	U-boat	857	26 June 1943	Scuttled 5 May 1945; scrapped 1946
U-429	Kriegsmarine	Type VIIC	U-boat	857	14 July 1943	Destroyed in dock 30 March 1945
U-430	Kriegsmarine	Type VIIC	U-boat	857	4 August 1943	Sunk 30 March 1945
U-431	Kriegsmarine	Type VIIC	U-boat	857	5 April 1941	Sunk 21 October 1943
U-432	Kriegsmarine	Type VIIC	U-boat	857	26 April 1941	Sunk 11 March 1943
U-433	Kriegsmarine	Type VIIC	U-boat	857	24 May 1941	Sunk 16 November 1941
U-434	Kriegsmarine	Type VIIC	U-boat	857	21 June 1941	Sunk 18 December 1941
U-435	Kriegsmarine	Type VIIC	U-boat	857	30 August 1941	Sunk 9 July 1943
U-436	Kriegsmarine	Type VIIC	U-boat	857	27 September 1941	Sunk 26 May 1943
U-437	Kriegsmarine	Type VIIC	U-boat	857	25 October 1941	Stricken 5 October 1944; scrapped 1946
U-438	Kriegsmarine	Type VIIC	U-boat	857	22 November 1941	Sunk 6 May 1943
U-439	Kriegsmarine	Type VIIC	U-boat	857	20 December 1941	Sunk 4 May 1943
U-440	Kriegsmarine	Type VIIC	U-boat	857	24 January 1942	Sunk 31 May 1943
U-441	Kriegsmarine	Type VIIC	U-boat	857	21 February 1942	Sunk 30 June 1944
U-442	Kriegsmarine	Type VIIC	U-boat	857	21 March 1942	Sunk 12 February 1943
U-443	Kriegsmarine	Type VIIC	U-boat	857	18 April 1942	Sunk 23 February 1943
U-444	Kriegsmarine	Type VIIC	U-boat	857	9 May 1942	Sunk 11 March 1943
U-445	Kriegsmarine	Type VIIC	U-boat	857	30 May 1942	Sunk 24 August 1944
U-446	Kriegsmarine	Type VIIC	U-boat	857	20 June 1942	Scuttled 3 May 1945; scrapped 1947
U-447	Kriegsmarine	Type VIIC	U-boat	857	11 July 1942	Sunk 7 May 1943
U-448	Kriegsmarine	Type VIIC	U-boat	857	1 August 1942	Sunk 14 April 1944
U-449	Kriegsmarine	Type VIIC	U-boat	857	22 August 1942	Sunk 24 June 1943
U-450	Kriegsmarine	Type VIIC	U-boat	857	12 September 1942	Sunk 10 March 1944
U-451	Kriegsmarine	Type VIIC	U-boat	857	3 May 1941	Sunk 21 December 1941
U-452	Kriegsmarine	Type VIIC	U-boat	857	29 May 1941	Sunk 25 August 1941
U-453	Kriegsmarine	Type VIIC	U-boat	857	26 June 1941	Sunk 21 May 1944
U-454	Kriegsmarine	Type VIIC	U-boat	857	24 July 1941	Sunk 1 August 1943
U-455	Kriegsmarine	Type VIIC	U-boat	857	21 August 1941	Sunk 5 April 1944
U-456	Kriegsmarine	Type VIIC	U-boat	857	18 September 1941	Sunk 12 May 1943
U-457	Kriegsmarine	Type VIIC	U-boat	857	5 November 1941	Sunk 16 September 1942
U-458	Kriegsmarine	Type VIIC	U-boat	857	12 December 1941	Sunk 22 August 1943
U-459	Kriegsmarine	Type XIV	supply U-boat	1,932	15 November 1941	Scuttled 24 July 1943
U-460	Kriegsmarine	Type XIV	supply U-boat	1,932	24 December 1941	Sunk 4 October 1943
U-461	Kriegsmarine	Type XIV	supply U-boat	1,932	30 January 1942	Sunk 30 July 1943
U-462	Kriegsmarine	Type XIV	supply U-boat	1,932	5 March 1942	Sunk 30 July 1943
U-463	Kriegsmarine	Type XIV	supply U-boat	1,932	2 April 1942	Sunk 16 May 1943
U-464	Kriegsmarine	Type XIV	supply U-boat	1,932	30 April 1942	Sunk 20 August 1942
U-465	Kriegsmarine	Type VIIC	U-boat	857	20 May 1942	Sunk 2 May 1943
U-466	Kriegsmarine	Type VIIC	U-boat	857	17 June 1942	Scuttled 19 August 1944
U-467	Kriegsmarine	Type VIIC	U-boat	857	15 July 1942	Sunk 25 May 1943
U-468	Kriegsmarine	Type VIIC	U-boat	857	12 August 1942	Sunk 11 August 1943
U-469	Kriegsmarine	Type VIIC	U-boat	857	7 October 1942	Sunk 25 March 1943
U-470	Kriegsmarine	Type VIIC	U-boat	857	7 January 1943	Sunk 16 October 1943
U-471	Kriegsmarine	Type VIIC	U-boat	857	5 May 1943	Sunk 6 August 1944
U-472	Kriegsmarine	Type VIIC	U-boat	857	26 May 1943	Sunk 4 March 1944
U-473	Kriegsmarine	Type VIIC	U-boat	857	16 June 1943	Sunk 6 May 1944
U-475	Kriegsmarine	Type VIIC	U-boat	857	7 July 1943	Scuttled 3 May 1945; scrapped 1947
U-476	Kriegsmarine	Type VIIC	U-boat	857	28 July 1943	Scuttled 25 May 1944
U-477	Kriegsmarine	Type VIIC	U-boat	857	18 August 1943	Sunk 3 June 1944
U-478	Kriegsmarine	Type VIIC	U-boat	857	8 September 1943	Sunk 30 June 1944
U-479	Kriegsmarine	Type VIIC	U-boat	857	27 October 1943	Sunk 27 November 1944
U-480	Kriegsmarine	Type VIIC	U-boat	857	6 October 1943	Sunk sometime between 29 January and 20 February 1945
U-481	Kriegsmarine	Type VIIC	U-boat	857	10 November 1943	Surrendered 9 May 1945; scuttled 30 November 1945
U-482	Kriegsmarine	Type VIIC	U-boat	857	1 December 1943	Sunk 25 November 1944
U-483	Kriegsmarine	Type VIIC	U-boat	857	22 December 1943	Surrendered 9 May 1945; scuttled 16 December 1945
U-484	Kriegsmarine	Type VIIC	U-boat	857	19 January 1944	Sunk 9 September 1944
U-485	Kriegsmarine	Type VIIC	U-boat	857	23 February 1944	Surrendered 12 May 1945; scuttled 8 December 1945
U-486	Kriegsmarine	Type VIIC	U-boat	857	22 March 1944	Sunk 12 April 1945
U-487	Kriegsmarine	Type XIV	supply U-boat	1,932	21 December 1942	Sunk 13 July 1943
U-488	Kriegsmarine	Type XIV	supply U-boat	1,932	1 February 1943	Sunk 26 April 1944
U-489	Kriegsmarine	Type XIV	supply U-boat	1,932	8 March 1943	Sunk 4 August 1943
U-490	Kriegsmarine	Type XIV	supply U-boat	1,932	27 March 1943	Sunk 12 June 1944
U-501	Kriegsmarine	Type IXC	U-boat	1,232	30 April 1941	Sunk 10 September 1941
U-502	Kriegsmarine	Type IXC	U-boat	1,232	31 May 1941	Sunk 6 July 1942
U-503	Kriegsmarine	Type IXC	U-boat	1,232	10 July 1941	Sunk 10 July 1941
U-504	Kriegsmarine	Type IXC	U-boat	1,232	30 July 1941	Sunk 30 July 1943
U-505	Kriegsmarine	Type IXC	U-boat	1,232	30 July 1941	Captured by U.S. Navy 4 June 1944; museum ship 25 September 1954
U-506	Kriegsmarine	Type IXC	U-boat	1,232	15 September 1941	Sunk 12 July 1943
U-507	Kriegsmarine	Type IXC	U-boat	1,232	8 October 1941	Sunk on 13 January 1943
U-508	Kriegsmarine	Type IXC	U-boat	1,232	20 October 1941	Sunk 12 November 1943
U-509	Kriegsmarine	Type IXC	U-boat	1,232	4 November 1941	Sunk 15 July 1943
U-510	Kriegsmarine	Type IXC	U-boat	1,232	25 November 1941	Surrendered to U.S. Navy 10 May 1945; transferred to French Navy as Bouan 1946; scrapped 1960
U-511	Kriegsmarine	Type IXC	U-boat	1,232	8 December 1941	Sold to Japan as Ro-500 16 September 1943; surrendered August 1945; scuttled 30 April 1946
U-512	Kriegsmarine	Type IXC	U-boat	1,232	20 December 1941	Sunk 2 October 1942
U-513	Kriegsmarine	Type IXC	U-boat	1,232	10 January 1942	Sunk 8 July 1943
U-514	Kriegsmarine	Type IXC	U-boat	1,232	24 January 1942	Sunk 19 July 1943
U-515	Kriegsmarine	Type IXC	U-boat	1,232	21 February 1942	Sunk 9 April 1944
U-516	Kriegsmarine	Type IXC	U-boat	1,232	21 February 1942	Surrendered 14 May 1945; scuttled 2 January 1946
U-517	Kriegsmarine	Type IXC	U-boat	1,232	21 March 1942	Sunk 21 November 1942
U-518	Kriegsmarine	Type IXC	U-boat	1,232	25 April 1942	Sunk 22 April 1945
U-519	Kriegsmarine	Type IXC	U-boat	1,232	7 May 1942	Missing after 31 January 1943
U-520	Kriegsmarine	Type IXC	U-boat	1,232	19 May 1942	Sunk 30 October 1942
U-521	Kriegsmarine	Type IXC	U-boat	1,232	3 June 1942	Sunk 2 June 1943
U-522	Kriegsmarine	Type IXC	U-boat	1,232	11 June 1942	Sunk 23 February 1943
U-523	Kriegsmarine	Type IXC	U-boat	1,232	25 June 1942	Sunk 25 August 1943
U-524	Kriegsmarine	Type IXC	U-boat	1,232	8 July 1942	Sunk 22 March 1943
U-525	Kriegsmarine	Type IXC/40	U-boat	1,237	30 July 1942	Sunk 11 August 1943
U-526	Kriegsmarine	Type IXC/40	U-boat	1,237	12 August 1942	Sunk 14 April 1943
U-527	Kriegsmarine	Type IXC/40	U-boat	1,237	2 September 1942	Sunk 23 July 1943
U-528	Kriegsmarine	Type IXC/40	U-boat	1,237	16 September 1942	Sunk 11 May 1943
U-529	Kriegsmarine	Type IXC/40	U-boat	1,237	30 September 1942	Sunk 15 February 1943
U-530	Kriegsmarine	Type IXC/40	U-boat	1,237	14 October 1942	Surrendered 10 July 1945; sunk as target 28 November 1947
U-531	Kriegsmarine	Type IXC/40	U-boat	1,237	28 October 1942	Sunk 6 May 1943
U-532	Kriegsmarine	Type IXC/40	U-boat	1,237	11 November 1942	Surrendered 13 May 1945; scuttled 9 December 1945
U-533	Kriegsmarine	Type IXC/40	U-boat	1,237	25 November 1942	Sunk 16 October 1943
U-534	Kriegsmarine	Type IXC/40	U-boat	1,237	23 December 1942	Sunk 5 May 1945; refloated 23 August 1993; museum ship 10 February 2009
U-535	Kriegsmarine	Type IXC/40	U-boat	1,237	23 December 1942	Sunk 5 July 1943
U-536	Kriegsmarine	Type IXC/40	U-boat	1,237	13 January 1943	Sunk 20 November 1943
U-537	Kriegsmarine	Type IXC/40	U-boat	1,237	27 January 1943	Sunk 10 November 1944
U-538	Kriegsmarine	Type IXC/40	U-boat	1,237	10 February 1943	Sunk 21 November 1943
U-539	Kriegsmarine	Type IXC/40	U-boat	1,237	24 February 1943	Surrendered 9 May 1945; sank under tow 4 December 1945
U-540	Kriegsmarine	Type IXC/40	U-boat	1,237	10 March 1943	Sunk 17 October 1943
U-541	Kriegsmarine	Type IXC/40	U-boat	1,237	24 March 1943	Surrendered 12 May 1945; scuttled 5 January 1946
U-542	Kriegsmarine	Type IXC/40	U-boat	1,237	7 April 1943	Sunk 28 November 1943
U-543	Kriegsmarine	Type IXC/40	U-boat	1,237	21 April 1943	Sunk 2 July 1944
U-544	Kriegsmarine	Type IXC/40	U-boat	1,237	5 May 1943	Sunk 16 January 1944
U-545	Kriegsmarine	Type IXC/40	U-boat	1,237	19 May 1943	Scuttled 10 February 1944
U-546	Kriegsmarine	Type IXC/40	U-boat	1,237	3 June 1943	Sunk 24 April 1945
U-547	Kriegsmarine	Type IXC/40	U-boat	1,237	16 June 1943	Mine damage 11 August 1944; decommissioned; possibly scuttled 31 December 1944
U-548	Kriegsmarine	Type IXC/40	U-boat	1,237	30 June 1943	Sunk 19 April 1945
U-549	Kriegsmarine	Type IXC/40	U-boat	1,237	14 July 1943	Sunk 29 May 1944
U-550	Kriegsmarine	Type IXC/40	U-boat	1,237	28 July 1943	Sunk 16 April 1944
U-551	Kriegsmarine	Type VIIC	U-boat	857	7 November 1940	Sunk 23 March 1941
U-552	Kriegsmarine	Type VIIC	U-boat	857	4 December 1940	Scuttled 5 May 1945
U-553	Kriegsmarine	Type VIIC	U-boat	857	23 December 1940	Missing after 20 January 1943
U-554	Kriegsmarine	Type VIIC	U-boat	857	15 January 1941	Scuttled 5 May 1945
U-555	Kriegsmarine	Type VIIC	U-boat	857	30 January 1941	Surrendered 3 May 1945; scrapped 1946
U-556	Kriegsmarine	Type VIIC	U-boat	857	6 February 1941	Sunk 27 June 1941
U-557	Kriegsmarine	Type VIIC	U-boat	857	13 February 1941	Sunk 16 December 1941
U-558	Kriegsmarine	Type VIIC	U-boat	857	20 February 1941	Sunk 20 July 1943
U-559	Kriegsmarine	Type VIIC	U-boat	857	27 February 1941	Sunk 30 October 1942
U-560	Kriegsmarine	Type VIIC	U-boat	857	6 March 1941	Scuttled 3 May 1945
U-561	Kriegsmarine	Type VIIC	U-boat	857	13 March 1941	Sunk 12 July 1943
U-562	Kriegsmarine	Type VIIC	U-boat	857	20 March 1941	Sunk 19 February 1943
U-563	Kriegsmarine	Type VIIC	U-boat	857	27 March 1941	Sunk 31 May 1943
U-564	Kriegsmarine	Type VIIC	U-boat	857	3 April 1941	Sunk 14 June 1943
U-565	Kriegsmarine	Type VIIC	U-boat	857	10 April 1941	Scuttled 30 September 1944
U-566	Kriegsmarine	Type VIIC	U-boat	857	17 April 1941	Scuttled 24 October 1943
U-567	Kriegsmarine	Type VIIC	U-boat	857	24 April 1941	Sunk 21 December 1941
U-568	Kriegsmarine	Type VIIC	U-boat	857	1 May 1941	Sunk 28 May 1942
U-569	Kriegsmarine	Type VIIC	U-boat	857	8 May 1941	Sunk 22 May 1943
U-570	Kriegsmarine	Type VIIC	U-boat	857	15 May 1941	Captured by Royal Canadian Navy 27 August 1941; commissioned in Royal Navy as HMS Graph; wrecked while under tow 20 March 1944;scrapped 1961
U-571	Kriegsmarine	Type VIIC	U-boat	857	22 May 1941	Sunk 28 January 1944
U-572	Kriegsmarine	Type VIIC	U-boat	857	29 May 1941	Sunk 3 August 1943
U-573	Kriegsmarine	Type VIIC	U-boat	857	5 June 1941	Interned 2 May 1942; sold to Spain as G-7 2 August 1942; decommissioned 2 May 1970; scrapped
U-574	Kriegsmarine	Type VIIC	U-boat	857	12 June 1941	Sunk 19 December 1941
U-575	Kriegsmarine	Type VIIC	U-boat	857	19 June 1941	Sunk 13 March 1944
U-576	Kriegsmarine	Type VIIC	U-boat	857	26 June 1941	Sunk 15 July 1942
U-577	Kriegsmarine	Type VIIC	U-boat	857	3 July 1941	Sunk 15 January 1942
U-578	Kriegsmarine	Type VIIC	U-boat	857	10 July 1941	Missing after 6 August 1942
U-579	Kriegsmarine	Type VIIC	U-boat	857	17 July 1941	Sunk 5 May 1945
U-580	Kriegsmarine	Type VIIC	U-boat	857	24 July 1941	Sunk in collision 11 November 1941
U-581	Kriegsmarine	Type VIIC	U-boat	857	31 July 1941	Sunk 2 February 1942
U-582	Kriegsmarine	Type VIIC	U-boat	857	7 August 1941	Sunk 5 October 1942
U-583	Kriegsmarine	Type VIIC	U-boat	857	14 August 1941	Sunk in collision 15 November 1941
U-584	Kriegsmarine	Type VIIC	U-boat	857	21 August 1941	Sunk 31 October 1943
U-585	Kriegsmarine	Type VIIC	U-boat	857	28 August 1941	Sunk 30 March 1942
U-586	Kriegsmarine	Type VIIC	U-boat	857	4 September 1941	Sunk 5 July 1944
U-587	Kriegsmarine	Type VIIC	U-boat	857	11 September 1941	Sunk 27 March 1942
U-588	Kriegsmarine	Type VIIC	U-boat	857	18 September 1941	Sunk 31 July 1942
U-589	Kriegsmarine	Type VIIC	U-boat	857	25 September 1941	Sunk 14 September 1942
U-590	Kriegsmarine	Type VIIC	U-boat	857	2 October 1941	Sunk 9 July 1943
U-591	Kriegsmarine	Type VIIC	U-boat	857	9 October 1941	Sunk 30 July 1943
U-592	Kriegsmarine	Type VIIC	U-boat	857	16 October 1941	Sunk 31 January 1944
U-593	Kriegsmarine	Type VIIC	U-boat	857	23 October 1941	Sunk 13 December 1943
U-594	Kriegsmarine	Type VIIC	U-boat	857	30 October 1941	Sunk 5 June 1943
U-595	Kriegsmarine	Type VIIC	U-boat	857	6 November 1941	Sunk 14 November 1942
U-596	Kriegsmarine	Type VIIC	U-boat	857	13 November 1941	Scuttled 30 September 1944
U-597	Kriegsmarine	Type VIIC	U-boat	857	20 November 1941	Sunk 12 October 1942
U-598	Kriegsmarine	Type VIIC	U-boat	857	27 November 1941	Sunk 23 July 1943
U-599	Kriegsmarine	Type VIIC	U-boat	857	4 December 1941	Sunk 24 October 1942
U-600	Kriegsmarine	Type VIIC	U-boat	857	11 December 1941	Sunk 25 November 1943
U-601	Kriegsmarine	Type VIIC	U-boat	857	18 December 1941	Sunk 25 February 1944
U-602	Kriegsmarine	Type VIIC	U-boat	857	29 December 1941	Missing after 19 April 1943
U-603	Kriegsmarine	Type VIIC	U-boat	857	2 January 1942	Missing after 19 February 1944
U-604	Kriegsmarine	Type VIIC	U-boat	857	8 January 1942	Scuttled 11 August 1943
U-605	Kriegsmarine	Type VIIC	U-boat	857	15 January 1942	Sunk 14 November 1942
U-606	Kriegsmarine	Type VIIC	U-boat	857	22 January 1942	Sunk 22 February 1943
U-607	Kriegsmarine	Type VIIC	U-boat	857	29 January 1942	Sunk 13 July 1943
U-608	Kriegsmarine	Type VIIC	U-boat	857	5 February 1942	Scuttled 10 August 1944
U-609	Kriegsmarine	Type VIIC	U-boat	857	12 February 1942	Sunk 6 February 1943
U-610	Kriegsmarine	Type VIIC	U-boat	857	19 February 1942	Sunk 8 October 1943
U-611	Kriegsmarine	Type VIIC	U-boat	857	26 February 1942	Sunk 8 December 1942
U-612	Kriegsmarine	Type VIIC	U-boat	857	5 March 1942	Scuttled 1 May 1945
U-613	Kriegsmarine	Type VIIC	U-boat	857	12 March 1942	Sunk 23 July 1943
U-614	Kriegsmarine	Type VIIC	U-boat	857	19 March 1942	Sunk 29 July 1943
U-615	Kriegsmarine	Type VIIC	U-boat	857	26 March 1942	Sunk 7 August 1943
U-616	Kriegsmarine	Type VIIC	U-boat	857	2 April 1942	Sunk 17 May 1944
U-617	Kriegsmarine	Type VIIC	U-boat	857	9 April 1942	Wrecked 12 September 1943
U-618	Kriegsmarine	Type VIIC	U-boat	857	16 April 1942	Sunk 14 August 1944
U-619	Kriegsmarine	Type VIIC	U-boat	857	23 April 1942	Sunk 5 October 1942
U-620	Kriegsmarine	Type VIIC	U-boat	857	30 April 1942	Sunk 13 February 1943
U-621	Kriegsmarine	Type VIIC	U-boat	857	7 May 1942	Sunk 18 August 1944
U-622	Kriegsmarine	Type VIIC	U-boat	857	14 May 1942	Sunk 24 July 1943
U-623	Kriegsmarine	Type VIIC	U-boat	857	21 May 1942	Sunk 21 February 1943
U-624	Kriegsmarine	Type VIIC	U-boat	857	28 May 1942	Sunk 7 February 1943
U-625	Kriegsmarine	Type VIIC	U-boat	857	4 June 1942	Sunk 10 March 1944
U-626	Kriegsmarine	Type VIIC	U-boat	857	11 June 1942	Sunk 15 December 1942
U-627	Kriegsmarine	Type VIIC	U-boat	857	18 June 1942	Sunk 27 October 1942
U-628	Kriegsmarine	Type VIIC	U-boat	857	25 June 1942	Sunk 3 July 1943
U-629	Kriegsmarine	Type VIIC	U-boat	857	2 July 1942	Sunk 7 June 1944
U-630	Kriegsmarine	Type VIIC	U-boat	857	9 July 1942	Sunk 6 May 1943
U-631	Kriegsmarine	Type VIIC	U-boat	857	16 July 1942	Sunk 17 October 1943
U-632	Kriegsmarine	Type VIIC	U-boat	857	23 July 1942	Sunk 6 April 1943
U-633	Kriegsmarine	Type VIIC	U-boat	857	30 July 1942	Sunk 8 March 1943
U-634	Kriegsmarine	Type VIIC	U-boat	857	6 August 1942	Sunk 30 August 1943
U-635	Kriegsmarine	Type VIIC	U-boat	857	13 August 1942	Sunk 5 April 1943
U-636	Kriegsmarine	Type VIIC	U-boat	857	20 August 1942	Sunk 21 April 1945
U-637	Kriegsmarine	Type VIIC	U-boat	857	27 August 1942	Surrendered 9 May 1945; scuttled 21 December 1945
U-638	Kriegsmarine	Type VIIC	U-boat	857	3 September 1942	Sunk 5 May 1943
U-639	Kriegsmarine	Type VIIC	U-boat	857	10 September 1942	Sunk 28 August 1943
U-640	Kriegsmarine	Type VIIC	U-boat	857	17 September 1942	Sunk 14 May 1943
U-641	Kriegsmarine	Type VIIC	U-boat	857	24 September 1942	Sunk 19 January 1944
U-642	Kriegsmarine	Type VIIC	U-boat	857	1 October 1942	Sunk 5 July 1944
U-643	Kriegsmarine	Type VIIC	U-boat	857	8 October 1942	Scuttled 8 October 1943
U-644	Kriegsmarine	Type VIIC	U-boat	857	15 October 1942	Sunk 7 April 1943
U-645	Kriegsmarine	Type VIIC	U-boat	857	22 October 1942	Missing after 12 December 1943
U-646	Kriegsmarine	Type VIIC	U-boat	857	29 October 1942	Sunk 17 May 1943
U-647	Kriegsmarine	Type VIIC	U-boat	857	5 November 1942	Missing after 28 July 1943
U-648	Kriegsmarine	Type VIIC	U-boat	857	12 November 1942	Missing after 22 November 1943
U-649	Kriegsmarine	Type VIIC	U-boat	857	19 November 1942	Sunk in collision 24 February 1943
U-650	Kriegsmarine	Type VIIC	U-boat	857	26 November 1942	Sunk 7 January 1945
U-651	Kriegsmarine	Type VIIC	U-boat	857	12 February 1941	Sunk 29 June 1941
U-652	Kriegsmarine	Type VIIC	U-boat	857	3 April 1941	Scuttled 2 June 1942
U-653	Kriegsmarine	Type VIIC	U-boat	857	25 May 1941	Sunk 15 March 1944
U-654	Kriegsmarine	Type VIIC	U-boat	857	5 July 1941	Sunk 22 August 1942
U-655	Kriegsmarine	Type VIIC	U-boat	857	11 August 1941	Sunk 24 March 1942
U-656	Kriegsmarine	Type VIIC	U-boat	857	17 September 1941	Sunk 1 March 1942
U-657	Kriegsmarine	Type VIIC	U-boat	857	8 October 1941	Sunk 17 May 1943
U-658	Kriegsmarine	Type VIIC	U-boat	857	5 November 1941	Sunk 30 October 1942
U-659	Kriegsmarine	Type VIIC	U-boat	857	9 December 1941	Sunk 4 May 1943
U-660	Kriegsmarine	Type VIIC	U-boat	857	8 January 1942	Sunk 12 November 1942
U-661	Kriegsmarine	Type VIIC	U-boat	857	12 February 1942	Sunk 15 October 1942
U-662	Kriegsmarine	Type VIIC	U-boat	857	9 April 1942	Sunk 21 July 1943
U-663	Kriegsmarine	Type VIIC	U-boat	857	14 May 1942	Sunk 8 May 1943
U-664	Kriegsmarine	Type VIIC	U-boat	857	17 June 1942	Sunk 9 August 1943
U-665	Kriegsmarine	Type VIIC	U-boat	857	22 July 1942	Missing after 22 March 1943
U-666	Kriegsmarine	Type VIIC	U-boat	857	26 August 1942	Sunk 10 February 1944
U-667	Kriegsmarine	Type VIIC	U-boat	857	21 October 1942	Sunk 26 August 1944
U-668	Kriegsmarine	Type VIIC	U-boat	857	16 November 1942	Surrendered 9 May 1945; scuttled 31 December 1945
U-669	Kriegsmarine	Type VIIC	U-boat	857	16 December 1942	Missing after 30 August 1943
U-670	Kriegsmarine	Type VIIC	U-boat	857	26 January 1943	Sunk in collision 20 August 1943
U-671	Kriegsmarine	Type VIIC	U-boat	857	3 March 1943	Sunk 4 August 1944
U-672	Kriegsmarine	Type VIIC	U-boat	857	6 April 1943	Scuttled 18 July 1944
U-673	Kriegsmarine	Type VIIC	U-boat	857	8 May 1943	Beached after collision 24 October 1944; scrapped 1946
U-674	Kriegsmarine	Type VIIC	U-boat	857	15 June 1943	Sunk 2 May 1944
U-675	Kriegsmarine	Type VIIC	U-boat	857	14 July 1943	Sunk 24 May 1944
U-676	Kriegsmarine	Type VIIC	U-boat	857	4 August 1943	Sunk 12 February 1945
U-677	Kriegsmarine	Type VIIC	U-boat	857	20 September 1943	Sunk 9 April 1945
U-678	Kriegsmarine	Type VIIC	U-boat	857	25 October 1943	Sunk 6 July 1944
U-679	Kriegsmarine	Type VIIC	U-boat	857	29 November 1943	Sunk 9 January 1945
U-680	Kriegsmarine	Type VIIC	U-boat	857	23 December 1943	Surrendered 5 May 1945; scuttled 28 December 1945
U-681	Kriegsmarine	Type VIIC	U-boat	857	3 February 1944	Sunk 11 March 1945
U-682	Kriegsmarine	Type VIIC	U-boat	857	17 April 1944	Destroyed in shipyard 11 March 1945
U-683	Kriegsmarine	Type VIIC	U-boat	857	30 May 1944	Missing after 3 April 1945
U-701	Kriegsmarine	Type VIIC	U-boat	857	16 July 1941	Sunk 7 July 1942
U-702	Kriegsmarine	Type VIIC	U-boat	857	3 September 1941	Sunk 31 March 1942
U-703	Kriegsmarine	Type VIIC	U-boat	857	16 October 1941	Missing after 16 September 1944
U-704	Kriegsmarine	Type VIIC	U-boat	857	18 November 1941	Scuttled 30 April 1945
U-705	Kriegsmarine	Type VIIC	U-boat	857	30 December 1941	Sunk 3 September 1942
U-706	Kriegsmarine	Type VIIC	U-boat	857	16 March 1942	Sunk 2 August 1943
U-707	Kriegsmarine	Type VIIC	U-boat	857	1 July 1942	Sunk 9 November 1943
U-708	Kriegsmarine	Type VIIC	U-boat	857	24 July 1942	Scuttled 5 May 1945
U-709	Kriegsmarine	Type VIIC	U-boat	857	12 August 1942	Sunk 1 March 1944
U-710	Kriegsmarine	Type VIIC	U-boat	857	2 September 1942	Sunk 24 April 1943
U-711	Kriegsmarine	Type VIIC	U-boat	857	26 September 1942	Sunk 4 May 1945
U-712	Kriegsmarine	Type VIIC	U-boat	857	5 November 1942	Surrendered 9 May 1945; scrapped 1950
U-713	Kriegsmarine	Type VIIC	U-boat	857	29 December 1942	Missing after 24 February 1944
U-714	Kriegsmarine	Type VIIC	U-boat	857	10 February 1943	Sunk 14 March 1945
U-715	Kriegsmarine	Type VIIC	U-boat	857	17 March 1943	Sunk 3 June 1944
U-716	Kriegsmarine	Type VIIC	U-boat	857	15 April 1943	Surrendered 9 May 1945; scuttled 11 December 1945
U-717	Kriegsmarine	Type VIIC	U-boat	857	19 May 1943	Scuttled 5 May 1945
U-718	Kriegsmarine	Type VIIC	U-boat	857	25 June 1943	Sunk in collision 18 November 1943
U-719	Kriegsmarine	Type VIIC	U-boat	857	27 July 1943	Sunk 26 June 1944
U-720	Kriegsmarine	Type VIIC	U-boat	857	17 September 1943	Surrendered 5 May 1945; scuttled 21 December 1945
U-721	Kriegsmarine	Type VIIC	U-boat	857	8 November 1943	Scuttled 5 May 1945
U-722	Kriegsmarine	Type VIIC	U-boat	857	15 December 1943	Sunk 27 March 1945
U-731	Kriegsmarine	Type VIIC	U-boat	857	3 October 1942	Sunk 5 May 1945
U-732	Kriegsmarine	Type VIIC	U-boat	857	24 October 1942	Scuttled 31 October 1943
U-733	Kriegsmarine	Type VIIC	U-boat	857	15 December 1943	Scuttled 5 May 1945
U-734	Kriegsmarine	Type VIIC	U-boat	857	5 December 1942	Sunk 9 February 1944
U-735	Kriegsmarine	Type VIIC	U-boat	857	28 December 1942	Sunk 28 December 1944
U-736	Kriegsmarine	Type VIIC	U-boat	857	16 January 1943	Sunk 6 August 1944
U-737	Kriegsmarine	Type VIIC	U-boat	857	30 January 1943	Sunk 19 December 1944
U-738	Kriegsmarine	Type VIIC	U-boat	857	20 February 1943	Sunk 14 February 1944
U-739	Kriegsmarine	Type VIIC	U-boat	857	6 March 1943	Surrendered 13 May 1945; scuttled 16 December 1945
U-740	Kriegsmarine	Type VIIC	U-boat	857	27 March 1943	Sunk 8 June 1944
U-741	Kriegsmarine	Type VIIC	U-boat	857	10 April 1943	Sunk 15 August 1944
U-742	Kriegsmarine	Type VIIC	U-boat	857	1 May 1943	Sunk 18 July 1944
U-743	Kriegsmarine	Type VIIC	U-boat	857	15 May 1943	Missing after 22 August 1944
U-744	Kriegsmarine	Type VIIC	U-boat	857	5 June 1943	Captured and scuttled 6 March 1944
U-745	Kriegsmarine	Type VIIC	U-boat	857	19 June 1943	Sunk 31 January 1945
U-746	Kriegsmarine	Type VIIC	U-boat	857	4 July 1943	Scuttled 5 May 1945
U-747	Kriegsmarine	Type VIIC	U-boat	857	17 July 1943	Scuttled 5 May 1945
U-748	Kriegsmarine	Type VIIC	U-boat	857	31 July 1943	Scuttled 5 May 1945
U-749	Kriegsmarine	Type VIIC	U-boat	857	14 August 1943	Sunk 4 April 1945
U-750	Kriegsmarine	Type VIIC	U-boat	857	26 August 1943	Scuttled 5 May 1945
U-751	Kriegsmarine	Type VIIC	U-boat	857	31 January 1941	Sunk 17 July 1942
U-752	Kriegsmarine	Type VIIC	U-boat	857	24 May 1941	Scuttled 23 May 1943
U-753	Kriegsmarine	Type VIIC	U-boat	857	18 June 1941	Sunk 13 May 1943
U-754	Kriegsmarine	Type VIIC	U-boat	857	28 August 1941	Sunk 31 July 1942
U-755	Kriegsmarine	Type VIIC	U-boat	857	3 November 1941	Sunk 28 May 1943
U-756	Kriegsmarine	Type VIIC	U-boat	857	30 December 1941	Sunk 1 September 1942
U-757	Kriegsmarine	Type VIIC	U-boat	857	28 February 1942	Sunk 8 January 1944
U-758	Kriegsmarine	Type VIIC	U-boat	857	5 May 1942	Surrendered May 1945; scrapped 1946 or 1947
U-759	Kriegsmarine	Type VIIC	U-boat	857	15 August 1942	Sunk 15 July 1943
U-760	Kriegsmarine	Type VIIC	U-boat	857	15 October 1942	Interned 8 September 1943; scuttled 13 December 1945
U-761	Kriegsmarine	Type VIIC	U-boat	857	3 December 1942	Scuttled 24 February 1944
U-762	Kriegsmarine	Type VIIC	U-boat	857	30 January 1943	Sunk 8 February 1944
U-763	Kriegsmarine	Type VIIC	U-boat	857	13 March 1943	Scuttled 29 January 1945
U-764	Kriegsmarine	Type VIIC	U-boat	857	6 May 1943	Surrendered 14 May 1945; scuttled 2 February 1946
U-765	Kriegsmarine	Type VIIC	U-boat	857	19 June 1943	Sunk 6 May 1944
U-766	Kriegsmarine	Type VIIC	U-boat	857	30 July 1943	Surrendered 8 May 1945; transferred to French Navy as Laubie 8 May 1945; scrapped 1963
U-767	Kriegsmarine	Type VIIC	U-boat	857	11 September 1943	Sunk 18 June 1944
U-768	Kriegsmarine	Type VIIC	U-boat	857	14 October 1943	Sunk in collision 20 November 1943
U-771	Kriegsmarine	Type VIIC	U-boat	857	18 November 1943	Sunk 11 November 1944
U-772	Kriegsmarine	Type VIIC	U-boat	857	23 December 1943	Sunk 17 December 1944
U-773	Kriegsmarine	Type VIIC	U-boat	857	20 January 1944	Surrendered 9 May 1945; scuttled 8 December 1945
U-774	Kriegsmarine	Type VIIC	U-boat	857	17 February 1944	Sunk 8 April 1945
U-775	Kriegsmarine	Type VIIC	U-boat	857	23 March 1944	Surrendered 9 May 1945; scuttled 8 December 1945
U-776	Kriegsmarine	Type VIIC	U-boat	857	13 April 1944	Surrendered 16 May 1945; sank under tow 3 December 1945
U-777	Kriegsmarine	Type VIIC	U-boat	857	22 November 1944	Scuttled 5 May 1945
U-778	Kriegsmarine	Type VIIC	U-boat	857	7 July 1944	Surrendered 9 May 1945; scuttled 4 December 1945
U-779	Kriegsmarine	Type VIIC	U-boat	857	24 August 1944	Surrendered 5 May 1945; scuttled 17 December 1945
U-792	Kriegsmarine	Type XVIIA	coastal U-boat	304	16 November 1943	Scuttled 4 May 1945
U-793	Kriegsmarine	Type XVIIA	coastal U-boat	304	24 April 1944	Scuttled 4 May 1945
U-794	Kriegsmarine	Type XVIIA	coastal U-boat	304	14 November 1943	Scuttled 5 May 1945; scrapped
U-795	Kriegsmarine	Type XVIIA	coastal U-boat	304	22 February 1945	Scuttled 3 May 1945; scrapped
U-801	Kriegsmarine	Type IXC/40	U-boat	1,237	24 March 1943	Scuttled 17 March 1944
U-802	Kriegsmarine	Type IXC/40	U-boat	1,237	12 June 1943	Surrendered 11 May 1945; scuttled 31 December 1945
U-803	Kriegsmarine	Type IXC/40	U-boat	1,237	7 September 1943	Sunk 27 April 1944
U-804	Kriegsmarine	Type IXC/40	U-boat	1,237	4 December 1943	Sunk 9 April 1945
U-805	Kriegsmarine	Type IXC/40	U-boat	1,237	12 February 1944	Surrendered 15 May 1945; scuttled 4 February 1946
U-806	Kriegsmarine	Type IXC/40	U-boat	1,237	29 April 1944	Surrendered 6 May 1945; scuttled 21 December 1945
U-821	Kriegsmarine	Type VIIC	U-boat	857	11 October 1943	Sunk 10 June 1944
U-822	Kriegsmarine	Type VIIC	U-boat	857	1 July 1944	Scuttled 5 May 1945
U-825	Kriegsmarine	Type VIIC	U-boat	857	4 May 1944	Surrendered 13 May 1945; scuttled 3 January 1946
U-826	Kriegsmarine	Type VIIC	U-boat	857	11 May 1944	Surrendered 11 May 1945; scuttled 1 December 1945
U-827	Kriegsmarine	Type VIIC/41	U-boat	846	25 May 1944	Scuttled 5 May 1945; scrapped 1948
U-828	Kriegsmarine	Type VIIC/41	U-boat	846	17 June 1944	Scuttled 5 May 1945
U-841	Kriegsmarine	Type IXC/40	U-boat	1,237	6 February 1943	Scuttled 17 October 1943
U-842	Kriegsmarine	Type IXC/40	U-boat	1,237	1 March 1943	Sunk 6 November 1943
U-843	Kriegsmarine	Type IXC/40	U-boat	1,237	24 March 1943	Sunk 9 April 1945
U-844	Kriegsmarine	Type IXC/40	U-boat	1,237	7 April 1943	Sunk 16 October 1943
U-845	Kriegsmarine	Type IXC/40	U-boat	1,237	1 May 1943	Sunk 10 March 1944
U-846	Kriegsmarine	Type IXC/40	U-boat	1,237	29 May 1943	Sunk 4 May 1944
U-847	Kriegsmarine	Type IXD2	U-boat	1,776	23 January 1943	Sunk 27 August 1943
U-848	Kriegsmarine	Type IXD2	U-boat	1,776	20 February 1943	Sunk 5 November 1943
U-849	Kriegsmarine	Type IXD2	U-boat	1,776	11 March 1943	Sunk 25 November 1943
U-850	Kriegsmarine	Type IXD2	U-boat	1,776	17 April 1943	Sunk 20 December 1943
U-851	Kriegsmarine	Type IXD2	U-boat	1,776	21 May 1943	Missing after 27 March 1944
U-852	Kriegsmarine	Type IXD2	U-boat	1,776	15 June 1943	Scuttled 3 May 1944
U-853	Kriegsmarine	Type IXC/40	U-boat	1,237	25 June 1943	Sunk 6 May 1945
U-854	Kriegsmarine	Type IXC/40	U-boat	1,237	19 July 1943	Sunk 4 February 1944
U-855	Kriegsmarine	Type IXC/40	U-boat	1,237	2 August 1943	Missing after 11 September 1944
U-856	Kriegsmarine	Type IXC/40	U-boat	1,237	19 August 1943	Scuttled 7 April 1944
U-857	Kriegsmarine	Type IXC/40	U-boat	1,237	16 September 1943	Missing after 30 April 1945
U-858	Kriegsmarine	Type IXC/40	U-boat	1,237	30 September 1943	Surrendered 14 May 1945; scuttled 21 November 1947
U-859	Kriegsmarine	Type IXD2	U-boat	1,771	8 July 1943	Sunk 23 September 1944
U-860	Kriegsmarine	Type IXD2	U-boat	1,771	12 August 1943	Sunk 15 June 1944
U-861	Kriegsmarine	Type IXD2	U-boat	1,771	2 September 1943	Surrendered 9 May 1945; scuttled 31 December 1945
U-862	Kriegsmarine	Type IXD2	U-boat	1,771	7 October 1943	Seized by Japan 5 May 1945; commissioned as I-502; surrendered August 1945; scuttled 15 February 1946
U-863	Kriegsmarine	Type IXD2	U-boat	1,771	3 November 1943	Sunk 29 September 1944
U-864	Kriegsmarine	Type IXD2	U-boat	1,771	9 December 1943	Sunk 9 February 1945
U-865	Kriegsmarine	Type IXC/40	U-boat	1,237	25 October 1943	Missing after 9 September 1944
U-866	Kriegsmarine	Type IXC/40	U-boat	1,237	17 November 1943	Sunk 18 March 1945
U-867	Kriegsmarine	Type IXC/40	U-boat	1,237	12 December 1943	Scuttled 19 September 1944
U-868	Kriegsmarine	Type IXC/40	U-boat	1,237	23 December 1943	Surrendered 9 May 1945; scuttled 30 November 1945
U-869	Kriegsmarine	Type IXC/40	U-boat	1,237	26 January 1944	Sunk 11 February 1945
U-870	Kriegsmarine	Type IXC/40	U-boat	1,237	3 February 1944	Sunk 30 March 1945
U-871	Kriegsmarine	Type IXD2	U-boat	1,771	15 January 1944	Sunk 26 September 1944
U-872	Kriegsmarine	Type IXD2	U-boat	1,771	10 February 1944	Decommissioned 10 August 1944; scrapped
U-873	Kriegsmarine	Type IXD2	U-boat	1,771	1 March 1944	Surrendered 16 May 1945; scrapped March 1948
U-874	Kriegsmarine	Type IXD2	U-boat	1,771	8 April 1944	Surrendered 9 May 1945; scuttled 31 December 1945
U-875	Kriegsmarine	Type IXD2	U-boat	1,771	21 April 1944	Surrendered 9 May 1945; scuttled 31 December 1945
U-876	Kriegsmarine	Type IXD2	U-boat	1,771	24 May 1944	Scuttled 3 May 1945
U-877	Kriegsmarine	Type IXC/40	U-boat	1,237	24 March 1944	Sunk 27 December 1944
U-878	Kriegsmarine	Type IXC/40	U-boat	1,237	14 April 1944	Sunk 10 April 1945
U-879	Kriegsmarine	Type IXC/40	U-boat	1,237	19 April 1944	Sunk 30 April 1945
U-880	Kriegsmarine	Type IXC/40	U-boat	1,237	11 May 1944	Sunk 16 April 1945
U-881	Kriegsmarine	Type IXC/40	U-boat	1,237	27 May 1944	Sunk 6 May 1945
U-883	Kriegsmarine	Type IXD/42	U-boat	1,776	27 March 1945	Surrendered 5 May 1945; scuttled 31 December 1945
U-889	Kriegsmarine; Royal Canadian Navy	Type IXC/40	U-boat	1,257	4 August 1944	Surrendered to Royal Canadian Navy 10 May 1945, commissioned by RCN 14 May 1 945, paid off December 1945, scuttled 1947
U-901	Kriegsmarine	Type VIIC	U-boat	857	29 April 1944	Surrendered 15 May 1945; scuttled 5 January 1946
U-903	Kriegsmarine	Type VIIC	U-boat	857	4 September 1943	Scuttled 5 May 1945
U-904	Kriegsmarine	Type VIIC	U-boat	857	25 September 1943	Scuttled 4 May 1945
U-905	Kriegsmarine	Type VIIC	U-boat	857	8 March 1944	Sunk 27 March 1945
U-907	Kriegsmarine	Type VIIC	U-boat	857	18 May 1944	Surrendered 9 May 1945; scuttled 7 December 1945
U-921	Kriegsmarine	Type VIIC	U-boat	857	30 May 1943	Missing after 24 September 1944
U-922	Kriegsmarine	Type VIIC	U-boat	857	1 August 1943	Scuttled 3 May 1945
U-923	Kriegsmarine	Type VIIC	U-boat	857	4 October 1943	Sunk 9 February 1945
U-924	Kriegsmarine	Type VIIC	U-boat	857	20 November 1943	Scuttled 3 May 1945
U-925	Kriegsmarine	Type VIIC	U-boat	857	30 December 1943	Missing after 25 August 1944
U-926	Kriegsmarine	Type VIIC	U-boat	857	29 February 1944	Surrendered 9 May 1945; transferred to Norway as Kya 10 January 1949; retired 1962
U-927	Kriegsmarine	Type VIIC	U-boat	857	29 February 1944	Sunk 24 February 1945
U-928	Kriegsmarine	Type VIIC	U-boat	857	11 July 1944	Surrendered 9 May 1945; scuttled 16 December 1945
U-929	Kriegsmarine	Type VIIC/41	U-boat	846	6 September 1944	Scuttled 1 May 1945
U-930	Kriegsmarine	Type VIIC/41	U-boat	846	6 December 1944	Surrendered 9 May 1945; scuttled 29 December 1945
U-951	Kriegsmarine	Type VIIC	U-boat	857	3 December 1942	Sunk 7 July 1943
U-952	Kriegsmarine	Type VIIC	U-boat	857	10 December 1942	Decommissioned 12 July 1944; scrapped 1946
U-953	Kriegsmarine	Type VIIC	U-boat	857	10 December 1942	Surrendered 9 May 1945; scrapped 1950
U-954	Kriegsmarine	Type VIIC	U-boat	857	23 December 1942	Sunk 19 May 1943
U-955	Kriegsmarine	Type VIIC	U-boat	857	31 December 1942	Sunk 7 June 1944
U-956	Kriegsmarine	Type VIIC	U-boat	857	6 January 1943	Surrendered 13 May 1945; scuttled 17 December 1945
U-957	Kriegsmarine	Type VIIC	U-boat	857	7 January 1943	Decommissioned 21 October 1944; probably scuttled May 1945
U-958	Kriegsmarine	Type VIIC	U-boat	857	14 January 1943	Scuttled 3 May 1945
U-959	Kriegsmarine	Type VIIC	U-boat	857	21 January 1943	Sunk 2 May 1944
U-960	Kriegsmarine	Type VIIC	U-boat	857	28 January 1943	Sunk 19 May 1944
U-961	Kriegsmarine	Type VIIC	U-boat	857	4 February 1943	Sunk 29 March 1944
U-962	Kriegsmarine	Type VIIC	U-boat	857	11 February 1943	Sunk 8 April 1944
U-963	Kriegsmarine	Type VIIC	U-boat	857	17 February 1943	Scuttled 20 May 1945
U-964	Kriegsmarine	Type VIIC	U-boat	857	18 February 1943	Sunk 16 October 1943
U-965	Kriegsmarine	Type VIIC	U-boat	857	25 February 1943	Sunk 30 March 1945
U-966	Kriegsmarine	Type VIIC	U-boat	857	4 March 1943	Scuttled 10 November 1943
U-967	Kriegsmarine	Type VIIC	U-boat	857	11 March 1943	Scuttled 19 August 1944
U-968	Kriegsmarine	Type VIIC	U-boat	857	18 March 1943	Surrendered 9 May 1945; scuttled 29 November 1945
U-969	Kriegsmarine	Type VIIC	U-boat	857	24 March 1943	Sunk 6 August 1944
U-970	Kriegsmarine	Type VIIC	U-boat	857	25 March 1943	Sunk 8 June 1944
U-971	Kriegsmarine	Type VIIC	U-boat	857	1 April 1943	Sunk 24 June 1944
U-972	Kriegsmarine	Type VIIC	U-boat	857	8 April 1943	Missing after 15 December 1943
U-973	Kriegsmarine	Type VIIC	U-boat	857	15 April 1943	Sunk 6 March 1944
U-974	Kriegsmarine	Type VIIC	U-boat	857	22 April 1943	Sunk 19 April 1944
U-975	Kriegsmarine	Type VIIC	U-boat	857	29 April 1943	Surrendered 9 May 1945; scuttled 10 February 1946
U-976	Kriegsmarine	Type VIIC	U-boat	857	5 May 1943	Sunk 25 March 1944
U-977	Kriegsmarine	Type VIIC	U-boat	857	6 May 1943	Surrendered 17 August 1945; sunk as target 13 November 1946
U-978	Kriegsmarine	Type VIIC	U-boat	857	12 May 1943	Surrendered 9 May 1945; scuttled 11 December 1945
U-979	Kriegsmarine	Type VIIC	U-boat	857	20 May 1943	Scuttled 24 May 1945
U-980	Kriegsmarine	Type VIIC	U-boat	857	27 May 1943	Sunk 11 June 1944
U-981	Kriegsmarine	Type VIIC	U-boat	857	3 June 1943	Sunk 12 August 1944
U-982	Kriegsmarine	Type VIIC	U-boat	857	10 June 1943	Destroyed in shipyard 9 April 1945
U-983	Kriegsmarine	Type VIIC	U-boat	857	16 June 1943	Sunk 8 September 1943
U-984	Kriegsmarine	Type VIIC	U-boat	857	17 June 1943	Sunk ca. 2 August 1944
U-985	Kriegsmarine	Type VIIC	U-boat	857	24 June 1943	Decommissioned 15 November 1944; captured 1945; scrapped
U-986	Kriegsmarine	Type VIIC	U-boat	857	1 July 1943	Missing after 10 April 1944
U-987	Kriegsmarine	Type VIIC	U-boat	857	8 July 1943	Sunk 15 June 1944
U-988	Kriegsmarine	Type VIIC	U-boat	857	15 July 1943	Sunk 22 June 1944
U-989	Kriegsmarine	Type VIIC	U-boat	857	22 July 1943	Sunk 14 February 1945
U-990	Kriegsmarine	Type VIIC	U-boat	857	28 July 1943	Sunk 25 May 1944
U-991	Kriegsmarine	Type VIIC	U-boat	857	29 July 1943	Surrendered 9 May 1945; scuttled 11 December 1945
U-992	Kriegsmarine	Type VIIC	U-boat	857	2 August 1943	Surrendered 9 May 1945; scuttled 16 December 1945
U-993	Kriegsmarine	Type VIIC	U-boat	857	19 August 1943	Sunk 4 October 1944
U-994	Kriegsmarine	Type VIIC	U-boat	857	2 September 1943	Surrendered 9 May 1945; scuttled 5 December 1945
U-995	Kriegsmarine	Type VIIC/41	U-boat	846	16 September 1943	Surrendered 9 May 1945; to Norway October 1948; commissioned as Kaura 1 December 1952; stricken 1965; museum ship October 1971
U-997	Kriegsmarine	Type VIIC/41	U-boat	846	23 September 1943	Surrendered 9 May 1945; scuttled 13 December 1945
U-998	Kriegsmarine	Type VIIC/41	U-boat	846	27 June 1944	Scrapped 1944
U-999	Kriegsmarine	Type VIIC/41	U-boat	846	21 October 1943	Scuttled 5 May 1945
U-1000	Kriegsmarine	Type VIIC/41	U-boat	846	4 November 1943	Decommissioned 29 September 1944; scrapped 1945
U-1001	Kriegsmarine	Type VIIC/41	U-boat	846	18 November 1943	Sunk 8 April 1945
U-1002	Kriegsmarine	Type VIIC/41	U-boat	846	30 November 1943	Surrendered 9 May 1945; scuttled 13 December 1945
U-1003	Kriegsmarine	Type VIIC/41	U-boat	846	9 December 1943	Scuttled 23 March 1945
U-1004	Kriegsmarine	Type VIIC/41	U-boat	846	16 December 1943	Surrendered 9 May 1945; scuttled 1 December 1945
U-1005	Kriegsmarine	Type VIIC/41	U-boat	846	30 December 1943	Surrendered 14 May 1945; sank under tow 5 December 1945
U-1006	Kriegsmarine	Type VIIC/41	U-boat	846	11 January 1944	Sunk 16 October 1944
U-1007	Kriegsmarine	Type VIIC/41	U-boat	846	18 January 1944	Scuttled 2 May 1945
U-1008	Kriegsmarine	Type VIIC/41	U-boat	846	1 February 1944	Scuttled 6 May 1945
U-1009	Kriegsmarine	Type VIIC/41	U-boat	846	10 February 1944	Surrendered 10 May 1945; scuttled 16 December 1945
U-1010	Kriegsmarine	Type VIIC/41	U-boat	846	22 February 1944	Surrendered 14 May 1945; scuttled 7 January 1946
U-1013	Kriegsmarine	Type VIIC/41	U-boat	846	2 March 1944	Sunk 4 February 1945
U-1014	Kriegsmarine	Type VIIC/41	U-boat	846	14 March 1944	Sunk 4 February 1945
U-1015	Kriegsmarine	Type VIIC/41	U-boat	846	23 March 1944	Sunk in collision 19 May 1944
U-1016	Kriegsmarine	Type VIIC/41	U-boat	846	4 April 1944	Scuttled 5 May 1945
U-1017	Kriegsmarine	Type VIIC/41	U-boat	846	13 April 1944	Sunk 29 April 1945
U-1018	Kriegsmarine	Type VIIC/41	U-boat	846	24 April 1944	Sunk 27 February 1945
U-1019	Kriegsmarine	Type VIIC/41	U-boat	846	4 May 1944	Surrendered 9 May 1945; scuttled 7 December 1945
U-1020	Kriegsmarine	Type VIIC/41	U-boat	846	17 May 1944	Sunk 9 January 1945
U-1021	Kriegsmarine	Type VIIC/41	U-boat	846	25 May 1944	Sunk 14 March 1945
U-1022	Kriegsmarine	Type VIIC/41	U-boat	846	7 June 1944	Surrendered 9 May 1945; scuttled 29 December 1945
U-1023	Kriegsmarine	Type VIIC/41	U-boat	846	15 June 1944	Surrendered 10 May 1945; scuttled 7 January 1946
U-1024	Kriegsmarine	Type VIIC/41	U-boat	846	28 June 1944	Captured 12 April 1945; sank under tow 13 April 1945
U-1025	Kriegsmarine	Type VIIC/41	U-boat	846	12 April 1945	Scuttled 5 May 1945
U-1051	Kriegsmarine	Type VIIC	U-boat	857	4 March 1944	Sunk 26 January 1945
U-1052	Kriegsmarine	Type VIIC	U-boat	857	20 January 1944	Surrendered 9 May 1945; Sunk as target 9 December 1945
U-1053	Kriegsmarine	Type VIIC	U-boat	857	12 February 1944	Sank in diving accident 15 February 1945
U-1054	Kriegsmarine	Type VIIC	U-boat	857	25 March 1944	Scrapped May 1945
U-1055	Kriegsmarine	Type VIIC	U-boat	857	8 April 1944	Missing after 23 April 1945
U-1056	Kriegsmarine	Type VIIC	U-boat	857	29 April 1944	Scuttled 5 May 1945
U-1057	Kriegsmarine	Type VIIC	U-boat	857	20 May 1944	Surrendered 9 May 1945; to United Kingdom as N22 1945; to Soviet Union 4 December 1945; renamed S-81 9 June 1949; sunk as target 24 September 1957; stricken 16 October 1957; scrapped
U-1058	Kriegsmarine	Type VIIC	U-boat	857	10 June 1944	Surrendered 10 May 1945; to United Kingdom as N23 1945; to Soviet Union 4 December 1945; renamed S-82 9 June 1949; stricken 25 March 1957; apparently sunk as target
U-1059	Kriegsmarine	Type VIIF	torpedo transport U-boat	1,162	1 May 1943	Sunk 19 March 1944
U-1060	Kriegsmarine	Type VIIF	torpedo transport U-boat	1,162	15 May 1943	Wrecked 27 October 1944
U-1061	Kriegsmarine	Type VIIF	torpedo transport U-boat	1,162	25 August 1943	Surrendered May 1945; scuttled 1 December 1945
U-1062	Kriegsmarine	Type VIIF	torpedo transport U-boat	1,162	19 June 1943	Sunk 30 September 1944
U-1063	Kriegsmarine	Type VIIC/41	U-boat	846	8 July 1944	Sunk 15 April 1945
U-1064	Kriegsmarine	Type VIIC/41	U-boat	846	29 July 1944	Surrendered 9 May 1945; to Soviet Union as S-83; retired 12 March 1974; scrapped
U-1065	Kriegsmarine	Type VIIC/41	U-boat	846	23 September 1944	Sunk 9 April 1945
U-1101	Kriegsmarine	Type VIIC	U-boat	857	10 November 1943	Scuttled 5 May 1945
U-1102	Kriegsmarine	Type VIIC	U-boat	857	22 February 1944	Surrendered 13 May 1945; scuttled 21 December 1945
U-1103	Kriegsmarine	Type VIIC/41	U-boat	846	8 January 1944	Surrendered 5 May 1945; scuttled 30 December 1945
U-1104	Kriegsmarine	Type VIIC/41	U-boat	846	15 March 1944	Surrendered 9 May 1945; scuttled 1 December 1945
U-1105	Kriegsmarine	Type VIIC/41	U-boat	846	3 June 1944	Surrendered 9 May 1945; to United Kingdom as N-16 1945; to United States as U-1105 ca. January 1946; scuttled 19 September 1949
U-1106	Kriegsmarine	Type VIIC/41	U-boat	846	5 July 1944	Sunk 29 March 1945
U-1107	Kriegsmarine	Type VIIC/41	U-boat	846	8 August 1944	Sunk 30 April 1945
U-1108	Kriegsmarine	Type VIIC/41	U-boat	846	18 November 1944	Surrendered 9 May 1945; scrapped May 1949
U-1109	Kriegsmarine	Type VIIC/41	U-boat	846	18 November 1944	Surrendered 12 May 1945; sunk as target 6 January 1946
U-1110	Kriegsmarine	Type VIIC/41	U-boat	846	24 September 1944	Surrendered 14 May 1945; scuttled 21 December 1945
U-1131	Kriegsmarine	Type VIIC	U-boat	857	20 May 1944	Sunk 30 March 1945
U-1132	Kriegsmarine	Type VIIC	U-boat	857	24 June 1944	Scuttled 5 May 1945
U-1161	Kriegsmarine	Type VIIC	U-boat	857	27 September 1943	Scuttled 5 May 1945
U-1162	Kriegsmarine	Type VIIC	U-boat	857	15 September 1943	Scuttled 5 May 1945
U-1163	Kriegsmarine	Type VIIC/41	U-boat	846	6 October 1943	Surrendered 29 May 1945; scuttled 11 December 1945
U-1164	Kriegsmarine	Type VIIC/41	U-boat	846	27 October 1943	Sunk 24 July 1944; refloated and scrapped
U-1165	Kriegsmarine	Type VIIC/41	U-boat	846	17 November 1943	Surrendered 9 May 1945; scuttled 30 December 1945
U-1166	Kriegsmarine	Type VIIC/41	U-boat	846	28 August 1944	Scuttled 3 May 1945
U-1167	Kriegsmarine	Type VIIC/41	U-boat	846	29 December 1943	Sunk 30 March 1945
U-1168	Kriegsmarine	Type VIIC/41	U-boat	846	19 January 1944	Scuttled 4 May 1945
U-1169	Kriegsmarine	Type VIIC/41	U-boat	846	9 February 1944	Sunk 29 March 1945
U-1170	Kriegsmarine	Type VIIC/41	U-boat	846	1 March 1944	Scuttled 2 May 1945
U-1171	Kriegsmarine	Type VIIC/41	U-boat	846	22 March 1944	Surrendered 9 May 1945; to United Kingdom as N19; scrapped April 1949
U-1172	Kriegsmarine	Type VIIC/41	U-boat	846	20 April 1944	Sunk 27 January 1945
U-1191	Kriegsmarine	Type VIIC	U-boat	857	9 September 1943	Sunk 3 July 1944
U-1192	Kriegsmarine	Type VIIC	U-boat	857	23 September 1943	Scuttled 3 May 1945
U-1193	Kriegsmarine	Type VIIC	U-boat	857	7 October 1943	Scuttled 5 May 1945
U-1194	Kriegsmarine	Type VIIC	U-boat	857	21 October 1943	Surrendered 9 May 1945; scuttled 22 December 1945
U-1195	Kriegsmarine	Type VIIC	U-boat	857	4 November 1943	Sunk 6 April 1945
U-1196	Kriegsmarine	Type VIIC	U-boat	857	18 November 1943	Scuttled 2 May 1945
U-1197	Kriegsmarine	Type VIIC	U-boat	857	2 December 1943	Captured May 1945; scuttled February 1946
U-1198	Kriegsmarine	Type VIIC	U-boat	857	9 December 1943	Surrendered 8 May 1945; scuttled 17 December 1945
U-1199	Kriegsmarine	Type VIIC	U-boat	857	23 December 1943	Sunk 21 January 1945
U-1200	Kriegsmarine	Type VIIC	U-boat	857	13 January 1944	Sunk 11 November 1944
U-1201	Kriegsmarine	Type VIIC	U-boat	857	5 January 1944	Scuttled 3 May 1945
U-1202	Kriegsmarine	Type VIIC	U-boat	857	27 January 1944	Surrendered 9 May 1945; to Norway 9 May 1945; commissioned as Kinn 1 July 1951; scrapped 1963
U-1203	Kriegsmarine	Type VIIC	U-boat	857	10 February 1944	Surrendered 9 May 1945; scuttled 8 December 1945
U-1204	Kriegsmarine	Type VIIC	U-boat	857	17 February 1944	Scuttled 3 May 1945
U-1205	Kriegsmarine	Type VIIC	U-boat	857	2 March 1944	Scuttled 3 May 1945
U-1206	Kriegsmarine	Type VIIC	U-boat	857	16 March 1944	Scuttled 14 April 1945
U-1207	Kriegsmarine	Type VIIC	U-boat	857	23 March 1944	Scuttled 5 May 1945
U-1208	Kriegsmarine	Type VIIC	U-boat	857	6 April 1944	Sunk 24 February 1945
U-1209	Kriegsmarine	Type VIIC	U-boat	857	13 April 1944	Scuttled 18 December 1944
U-1210	Kriegsmarine	Type VIIC	U-boat	857	22 April 1944	Sunk 3 May 1945
U-1221	Kriegsmarine	Type IXC/40	U-boat	1,237	11 August 1943	Sunk 3 April 1945
U-1222	Kriegsmarine	Type IXC/40	U-boat	1,237	1 September 1943	Sunk 11 July 1944
U-1223	Kriegsmarine	Type IXC/40	U-boat	1,237	6 October 1943	Scuttled 5 May 1945
U-1224	Kriegsmarine	Type IXC/40	U-boat	1,237	20 October 1943	To Japan as Ro-501 15 February 1944; sunk 13 May 1944
U-1225	Kriegsmarine	Type IXC/40	U-boat	1,237	10 November 1943	Sunk 24 June 1944
U-1226	Kriegsmarine	Type IXC/40	U-boat	1,237	24 November 1943	Missing after 23 October 1944
U-1227	Kriegsmarine	Type IXC/40	U-boat	1,237	8 December 1943	Scuttled 3 May 1945; refloated and scrapped
U-1228	Kriegsmarine	Type IXC/40	U-boat	1,237	22 December 1943	Surrendered 17 May 1945; sunk as target 5 February 1946
U-1229	Kriegsmarine	Type IXC/40	U-boat	1,237	13 January 1944	Sunk 20 August 1944
U-1230	Kriegsmarine	Type IXC/40	U-boat	1,237	26 January 1944	Surrendered 8 May 1945; scuttled 17 December 1945
U-1231	Kriegsmarine	Type IXC/40	U-boat	1,237	9 February 1944	Surrendered May 1945; to Soviet Union as N-26 5 November 1945; stricken 31 January 1968; scrapped
U-1232	Kriegsmarine	Type IXC/40	U-boat	1,237	8 March 1944	Captured May 1945; sank under tow 4 March 1946
U-1233	Kriegsmarine	Type IXC/40	U-boat	1,237	22 March 1944	Surrendered May 1945; scuttled 29 December 1945
U-1234	Kriegsmarine	Type IXC/40	U-boat	1,237	19 April 1944	Scuttled 2 May 1945
U-1235	Kriegsmarine	Type IXC/40	U-boat	1,237	17 May 1944	Sunk 15 April 1945
U-1271	Kriegsmarine	Type VIIC/41	U-boat	846	12 January 1944	Surrendered 9 May 1945; scuttled 8 December 1945
U-1272	Kriegsmarine	Type VIIC/41	U-boat	846	16 February 1944	Surrendered 10 May 1945; scuttled 8 December 1945
U-1273	Kriegsmarine	Type VIIC/41	U-boat	846	28 January 1944	Sunk 17 February 1945
U-1274	Kriegsmarine	Type VIIC/41	U-boat	846	1 March 1944	Sunk 16 April 1945
U-1275	Kriegsmarine	Type VIIC/41	U-boat	846	22 March 1944	Scuttled 3 May 1945
U-1276	Kriegsmarine	Type VIIC/41	U-boat	846	6 April 1944	Sunk 20 February 1945
U-1277	Kriegsmarine	Type VIIC/41	U-boat	846	3 May 1944	Scuttled 3 June 1945
U-1278	Kriegsmarine	Type VIIC/41	U-boat	846	31 May 1944	Sunk 17 February 1945
U-1279	Kriegsmarine	Type VIIC/41	U-boat	846	5 July 1944	Sunk 27 February 1945
U-1301	Kriegsmarine	Type VIIC/41	U-boat	846	11 February 1944	Surrendered 9 May 1945; scuttled 16 December 1945
U-1302	Kriegsmarine	Type VIIC/41	U-boat	846	25 May 1944	Sunk 7 March 1945
U-1303	Kriegsmarine	Type VIIC/41	U-boat	846	5 April 1944	scuttled 5 May 1945
U-1304	Kriegsmarine	Type VIIC/41	U-boat	846	6 September 1944	Surrendered 9 May 1945; scuttled 16 December 1945
U-1305	Kriegsmarine	Type VIIC/41	U-boat	846	13 September 1944	Surrendered 10 May 1945; to United Kingdom as N25; to Soviet Union as S-84 5 December 1945; sunk as target 10 October 1957
U-1306	Kriegsmarine	Type VIIC/41	U-boat	846	20 December 1944	Scuttled 5 May 1945
U-1307	Kriegsmarine	Type VIIC/41	U-boat	846	17 November 1944	Surrendered 9 May 1945; scuttled 9 December 1945
U-1308	Kriegsmarine	Type VIIC/41	U-boat	846	17 January 1945	Scuttled 2 May 1945
U-1405	Kriegsmarine	Type XVIIB	coastal U-boat	332	21 December 1944	Scuttled 4 May 1945; refloated and scrapped
U-1406	Kriegsmarine	Type XVIIB	coastal U-boat	332	8 February 1945	Scuttled 7 May 1945; refloated and scrapped
U-1407	Kriegsmarine	Type XVIIB	coastal U-boat	332	13 March 1945	Scuttled 5 May 1945; refloated and rebuilt; commissioned in Royal Navy as HMS Meteorite 1946; retired September 1949; scrapped
U-2321	Kriegsmarine	Type XXIII	coastal U-boat	254	12 June 1944	Surrendered May 1945; scuttled 27 November 1945
U-2322	Kriegsmarine	Type XXIII	coastal U-boat	254	1 July 1944	Surrendered May 1945; scuttled 27 November 1945
U-2323	Kriegsmarine	Type XXIII	coastal U-boat	254	18 July 1944	Sunk 26 July 1944
U-2324	Kriegsmarine	Type XXIII	coastal U-boat	254	25 July 1944	Surrendered May 1945; scuttled 27 November 1945
U-2325	Kriegsmarine	Type XXIII	coastal U-boat	254	3 August 1944	Surrendered 9 May 1945; scuttled 28 November 1945
U-2326	Kriegsmarine	Type XXIII	coastal U-boat	254	11 August 1944	Surrendered 14 May 1945; to United Kingdom as N35; transferred to France 1946; sank in accident 6 December 1946
U-2327	Kriegsmarine	Type XXIII	coastal U-boat	254	19 August 1944	Scuttled 2 May 1945; refloated and scrapped
U-2328	Kriegsmarine	Type XXIII	coastal U-boat	254	25 August 1944	Surrendered 9 May 1945; sank under tow 27 November 1945
U-2329	Kriegsmarine	Type XXIII	coastal U-boat	254	1 September 1944	Surrendered 9 May 1945; scuttled 28 November 1945
U-2330	Kriegsmarine	Type XXIII	coastal U-boat	254	7 September 1944	Scuttled 3 May 1945; refloated and scrapped
U-2331	Kriegsmarine	Type XXIII	coastal U-boat	254	12 September 1944	Sank in diving accident 10 October 1944
U-2332	Kriegsmarine	Type XXIII	coastal U-boat	254	13 November 1944	Scuttled 3 May 1945; refloated and scrapped
U-2333	Kriegsmarine	Type XXIII	coastal U-boat	254	18 December 1944	Scuttled 3 May 1945; refloated and scrapped
U-2334	Kriegsmarine	Type XXIII	coastal U-boat	254	21 September 1944	Surrendered 9 May 1945; scuttled 28 November 1945
U-2335	Kriegsmarine	Type XXIII	coastal U-boat	254	27 September 1944	Surrendered 9 May 1945; scuttled 28 November 1945
U-2336	Kriegsmarine	Type XXIII	coastal U-boat	254	30 September 1944	Surrendered 21 June 1945; scuttled 3 January 1946
U-2337	Kriegsmarine	Type XXIII	coastal U-boat	254	4 October 1944	Surrendered 9 May 1945; scuttled 28 November 1945
U-2338	Kriegsmarine	Type XXIII	coastal U-boat	254	9 October 1944	Sunk 4 May 1945
U-2339	Kriegsmarine	Type XXIII	coastal U-boat	254	16 November 1944	Scuttled 5 May 1945; refloated and scrapped
U-2340	Kriegsmarine	Type XXIII	coastal U-boat	254	16 October 1944	Sunk 30 March 1945; refloated and scrapped
U-2341	Kriegsmarine	Type XXIII	coastal U-boat	254	21 October 1944	Surrendered 9 May 1945; scuttled 31 December 1945
U-2342	Kriegsmarine	Type XXIII	coastal U-boat	254	11 November 1944	Sunk 26 December 1944
U-2343	Kriegsmarine	Type XXIII	coastal U-boat	254	6 November 1944	Scuttled 5 May 1945; refloated and scrapped
U-2344	Kriegsmarine	Type XXIII	coastal U-boat	254	10 November 1944	Sunk in collision 18 February 1945; refloated 1956; scrapped 1958
U-2345	Kriegsmarine	Type XXIII	coastal U-boat	254	15 November 1944	Surrendered 9 May 1945; scuttled 27 November 1945
U-2346	Kriegsmarine	Type XXIII	coastal U-boat	254	20 November 1944	Scuttled 5 May 1945; refloated and scrapped
U-2347	Kriegsmarine	Type XXIII	coastal U-boat	254	2 December 1944	Scuttled 5 May 1945; refloated and scrapped
U-2348	Kriegsmarine	Type XXIII	coastal U-boat	254	4 December 1944	Surrendered 9 May 1945; scrapped April 1949
U-2349	Kriegsmarine	Type XXIII	coastal U-boat	254	11 December 1944	Scuttled 5 May 1945; refloated and scrapped
U-2350	Kriegsmarine	Type XXIII	coastal U-boat	254	23 December 1944	Surrendered 9 May 1945; scuttled 28 November 1945
U-2351	Kriegsmarine	Type XXIII	coastal U-boat	254	30 December 1944	Surrendered May 1945; scuttled 253 January 1946
U-2352	Kriegsmarine	Type XXIII	coastal U-boat	254	11 January 1945	Scuttled 5 May 1945; refloated and scrapped
U-2353	Kriegsmarine	Type XXIII	coastal U-boat	254	9 January 1945	Surrendered 9 May 1945; to United Kingdom as N31; to Soviet Union 5 December 1945; named M-51 9 June 1949; stricken 17 March 1952; scrapped 1963
U-2354	Kriegsmarine	Type XXIII	coastal U-boat	254	11 January 1945	Surrendered 9 May 1945; scuttled 22 December 1945
U-2355	Kriegsmarine	Type XXIII	coastal U-boat	254	12 January 1945	Scuttled 3 May 1945
U-2356	Kriegsmarine	Type XXIII	coastal U-boat	254	12 January 1945	Surrendered 5 May 1945; scuttled 22 December 1945
U-2357	Kriegsmarine	Type XXIII	coastal U-boat	254	13 January 1945	Scuttled 5 May 1945; refloated and scrapped
U-2358	Kriegsmarine	Type XXIII	coastal U-boat	254	17 January 1945	Scuttled 5 May 1945; refloated and scrapped
U-2359	Kriegsmarine	Type XXIII	coastal U-boat	254	16 January 1945	Sunk 2 May 1945
U-2360	Kriegsmarine	Type XXIII	coastal U-boat	254	23 January 1945	Scuttled 5 May 1945; refloated and scrapped
U-2361	Kriegsmarine	Type XXIII	coastal U-boat	254	3 February 1945	Surrendered 9 May 1945; scuttled 27 November 1945
U-2362	Kriegsmarine	Type XXIII	coastal U-boat	254	5 February 1945	Scuttled 5 May 1945; refloated and scrapped
U-2363	Kriegsmarine	Type XXIII	coastal U-boat	254	5 February 1945	Surrendered 9 May 1945; scuttled 28 November 1945
U-2364	Kriegsmarine	Type XXIII	coastal U-boat	254	14 February 1945	Scuttled 5 May 1945; refloated and scrapped
U-2365	Kriegsmarine	Type XXIII	coastal U-boat	254	2 March 1945	Scuttled 8 May 1945; refloated June 1956; commissioned in German Federal Navy as U-Hai 15 August 1957; sank 14 September 1966; refloated 19 September 1966; scrapped
U-2366	Kriegsmarine	Type XXIII	coastal U-boat	254	10 March 1945	Scuttled 5 May 1945; refloated and scrapped
U-2367	Kriegsmarine	Type XXIII	coastal U-boat	254	17 March 1945	Sunk in collision 5 May 1945; refloated August 1956; commissioned in German Federal Navy as U-Hecht 1 October 1957; scrapped 1969
U-2368	Kriegsmarine	Type XXIII	coastal U-boat	254	11 April 1945	Scuttled 5 May 1945; refloated and scrapped
U-2369	Kriegsmarine	Type XXIII	coastal U-boat	254	18 April 1945	Scuttled 5 May 1945; refloated and scrapped
U-2371	Kriegsmarine	Type XXIII	coastal U-boat	254	24 April 1945	Scuttled 3 May 1945; refloated and scrapped
U-2501	Kriegsmarine	Type XXI	U-boat	2,067	27 June 1944	Scuttled 3 May 1945
U-2502	Kriegsmarine	Type XXI	U-boat	2,067	19 July 1944	Surrendered 9 May 1945; scuttled 2 January 1946
U-2503	Kriegsmarine	Type XXI	U-boat	2,067	1 August 1944	Scuttled 4 May 1945
U-2504	Kriegsmarine	Type XXI	U-boat	2,067	12 August 1944	Scuttled 3 May 1945; refloated and scrapped
U-2505	Kriegsmarine	Type XXI	U-boat	2,067	7 November 1944	Scuttled 3 May 1945
U-2506	Kriegsmarine	Type XXI	U-boat	2,067	31 August 1944	Surrendered 9 May 1945; scuttled 5 January 1946
U-2507	Kriegsmarine	Type XXI	U-boat	2,067	8 September 1944	Scuttled 5 May 1945; refloated and scrapped
U-2508	Kriegsmarine	Type XXI	U-boat	2,067	26 September 1944	Scuttled 3 May 1945; refloated and scrapped
U-2509	Kriegsmarine	Type XXI	U-boat	2,067	21 September 1944	Sunk 8 April 1945
U-2510	Kriegsmarine	Type XXI	U-boat	2,067	27 September 1944	Scuttled 2 May 1945; refloated and scrapped
U-2511	Kriegsmarine	Type XXI	U-boat	2,067	27 September 1944	Surrendered 8 May 1945; scuttled 7 January 1946
U-2512	Kriegsmarine	Type XXI	U-boat	2,067	10 October 1944	Scuttled 3 May 1945; refloated and scrapped
U-2513	Kriegsmarine	Type XXI	U-boat	2,067	12 October 1944	Surrendered 8 May 1945; sunk as target 7 October 1951
U-2514	Kriegsmarine	Type XXI	U-boat	2,067	17 October 1944	Sunk 8 April 1945
U-2515	Kriegsmarine	Type XXI	U-boat	2,067	19 October 1944	Sunk 17 January 1945
U-2516	Kriegsmarine	Type XXI	U-boat	2,067	24 October 1944	Damaged beyond repair 9 April 1945; scrapped
U-2517	Kriegsmarine	Type XXI	U-boat	2,067	31 October 1944	Scuttled 5 May 1945; refloated and scrapped
U-2518	Kriegsmarine	Type XXI	U-boat	2,067	4 November 1944	Surrendered 8 May 1945; sunk as target 7 October 1951Scuttled 5 May 1945; to France as Roland Morillot 13 February 1946; Sold for scrap 21 May 1969
U-2519	Kriegsmarine	Type XXI	U-boat	2,067	15 November 1944	Scuttled 3 May 1945; refloated and scrapped
U-2520	Kriegsmarine	Type XXI	U-boat	2,067	25 December 1944	Scuttled 3 May 1945; refloated and scrapped
U-2521	Kriegsmarine	Type XXI	U-boat	2,067	21 November 1944	Sunk 3 May 1945
U-2522	Kriegsmarine	Type XXI	U-boat	2,067	22 November 1944	Scuttled 5 May 1945; refloated and scrapped
U-2523	Kriegsmarine	Type XXI	U-boat	2,067	26 December 1944	Sunk 17 January 1945
U-2524	Kriegsmarine	Type XXI	U-boat	2,067	16 January 1945	Scuttled 5 May 1945
U-2525	Kriegsmarine	Type XXI	U-boat	2,067	12 December 1944	Scuttled 5 May 1945; refloated and scrapped
U-2526	Kriegsmarine	Type XXI	U-boat	2,067	15 December 1944	Scuttled 2 May 1945; refloated and scrapped
U-2527	Kriegsmarine	Type XXI	U-boat	2,067	23 December 1944	Scuttled 2 May 1945; refloated and scrapped
U-2528	Kriegsmarine	Type XXI	U-boat	2,067	9 December 1944	Scuttled 2 May 1945; refloated and scrapped
U-2529	Kriegsmarine	Type XXI	U-boat	2,067	22 February 1945	Surrendered 9 May 1945; to United Kingdom as N27; to Soviet Union 4 December 1945; named B-27 9 June 1949; stricken 1 September 1972; scrapped
U-2530	Kriegsmarine	Type XXI	U-boat	2,067	25 November 1944	Sunk 31 December 1944; refloated; sunk 17 January 1945; refloated; damaged beyond repair 20 February 1945; scrapped
U-2531	Kriegsmarine	Type XXI	U-boat	2,067	10 January 1945	Scuttled 2 May 1945; refloated and scrapped
U-2533	Kriegsmarine	Type XXI	U-boat	2,067	18 January 1945	Scuttled 3 May 1945; refloated and scrapped
U-2534	Kriegsmarine	Type XXI	U-boat	2,067	17 January 1945	Scuttled 3 May 1945
U-2535	Kriegsmarine	Type XXI	U-boat	2,067	28 January 1945	Scuttled 3 May 1945; refloated and scrapped
U-2536	Kriegsmarine	Type XXI	U-boat	2,067	6 February 1945	Scuttled 3 May 1945; refloated and scrapped
U-2538	Kriegsmarine	Type XXI	U-boat	2,067	16 February 1945	Scuttled 8 May 1945; refloated and scrapped
U-2539	Kriegsmarine	Type XXI	U-boat	2,067	21 February 1945	Scuttled 3 May 1945; refloated and scrapped
U-2540	Kriegsmarine	Type XXI	U-boat	2,067	24 February 1945	Scuttled 4 May 1945; refloated June 1957; commissioned in German Federal Navy as Wilhelm Bauer 1 September 1960; museum ship 27 April 1984
U-2541	Kriegsmarine	Type XXI	U-boat	2,067	1 March 1945	Scuttled 5 May 1945; refloated and scrapped
U-2542	Kriegsmarine	Type XXI	U-boat	2,067	5 March 1945	Sunk 3 April 1945; refloated and scrapped
U-2543	Kriegsmarine	Type XXI	U-boat	2,067	7 March 1945	Scuttled 3 May 1945; refloated and scrapped
U-2544	Kriegsmarine	Type XXI	U-boat	2,067	10 March 1945	Scuttled 3 May 1945; refloated and scrapped 1952
U-2545	Kriegsmarine	Type XXI	U-boat	2,067	8 April 1945	Scuttled 3 May 1945
U-2546	Kriegsmarine	Type XXI	U-boat	2,067	21 March 1945	Scuttled 3 May 1945; refloated and scrapped
U-2548	Kriegsmarine	Type XXI	U-boat	2,067	9 April 1945	Scuttled 3 May 1945; refloated and scrapped
U-2551	Kriegsmarine	Type XXI	U-boat	2,067	24 April 1945	Run aground 5 May 1945; wreck destroyed 23 July 1945; scrapped
U-2552	Kriegsmarine	Type XXI	U-boat	2,067	21 April 1945	Scuttled 3 May 1945; refloated and scrapped
U-3001	Kriegsmarine	Type XXI	U-boat	2,067	20 July 1944	Scuttled 3 May 1945; refloated and scrapped
U-3002	Kriegsmarine	Type XXI	U-boat	2,067	6 August 1944	Scuttled 2 May 1945; refloated and scrapped
U-3003	Kriegsmarine	Type XXI	U-boat	2,067	22 August 1944	Sunk April 1945
U-3004	Kriegsmarine	Type XXI	U-boat	2,067	30 August 1944	Scuttled 2 May 1945
U-3005	Kriegsmarine	Type XXI	U-boat	2,067	20 September 1944	Scuttled 3 May 1945; refloated and scrapped
U-3006	Kriegsmarine	Type XXI	U-boat	2,067	5 October 1944	Scuttled 1 May 1945; refloated and scrapped
U-3007	Kriegsmarine	Type XXI	U-boat	2,067	22 October 1944	Sunk 24 February 1945; refloated and scrapped
U-3008	Kriegsmarine	Type XXI	U-boat	2,067	19 October 1944	Surrendered May 1945; sold for scrap 15 September 1955
U-3009	Kriegsmarine	Type XXI	U-boat	2,067	10 November 1944	Scuttled 1 May 1945; refloated and scrapped
U-3010	Kriegsmarine	Type XXI	U-boat	2,067	11 November 1944	Scuttled 3 May 1945; refloated and scrapped
U-3011	Kriegsmarine	Type XXI	U-boat	2,067	21 December 1944	Scuttled 3 May 1945; refloated and scrapped
U-3012	Kriegsmarine	Type XXI	U-boat	2,067	4 December 1944	Scuttled 3 May 1945; refloated and scrapped
U-3013	Kriegsmarine	Type XXI	U-boat	2,067	22 November 1944	Scuttled 3 May 1945; refloated and scrapped
U-3014	Kriegsmarine	Type XXI	U-boat	2,067	17 December 1944	Scuttled 3 May 1945
U-3015	Kriegsmarine	Type XXI	U-boat	2,067	17 December 1944	Scuttled 5 May 1945; refloated and scrapped
U-3016	Kriegsmarine	Type XXI	U-boat	2,067	5 January 1945	Scuttled 2 May 1945; refloated and scrapped
U-3017	Kriegsmarine	Type XXI	U-boat	2,067	5 January 1945	Surrendered 9 May 1945; to United Kingdom as N41; scrapped November 1949
U-3018	Kriegsmarine	Type XXI	U-boat	2,067	7 January 1945	Scuttled 2 May 1945; refloated and scrapped
U-3019	Kriegsmarine	Type XXI	U-boat	2,067	23 December 1944	Scuttled 2 May 1945; refloated and scrapped
U-3020	Kriegsmarine	Type XXI	U-boat	2,067	23 December 1944	Scuttled 2 May 1945; refloated and scrapped
U-3021	Kriegsmarine	Type XXI	U-boat	2,067	12 January 1945	Scuttled 2 May 1945; refloated and scrapped
U-3022	Kriegsmarine	Type XXI	U-boat	2,067	25 January 1945	Scuttled 5 May 1945; refloated and scrapped
U-3023	Kriegsmarine	Type XXI	U-boat	2,067	22 January 1945	Scuttled 3 May 1945; refloated and scrapped
U-3024	Kriegsmarine	Type XXI	U-boat	2,067	13 January 1945	Scuttled 3 May 1945; refloated and scrapped
U-3025	Kriegsmarine	Type XXI	U-boat	2,067	20 January 1945	Scuttled 3 May 1945; refloated and scrapped
U-3026	Kriegsmarine	Type XXI	U-boat	2,067	22 January 1945	Scuttled 3 May 1945; refloated and scrapped
German submarine U-3027	Kriegsmarine	Type XXI	U-boat	2,067	25 January 1945	Scuttled 3 May 1945; refloated and scrapped
U-3028	Kriegsmarine	Type XXI	U-boat	2,067	27 January 1945	Scuttled 3 May 1945; refloated and scrapped
U-3029	Kriegsmarine	Type XXI	U-boat	2,067	5 February 1945	Scuttled 3 May 1945; refloated and scrapped
U-3030	Kriegsmarine	Type XXI	U-boat	2,067	14 February 1945	Scuttled 8 May 1945
U-3031	Kriegsmarine	Type XXI	U-boat	2,067	28 February 1945	Scuttled 8 May 1945; refloated and scrapped
U-3032	Kriegsmarine	Type XXI	U-boat	2,067	12 February 1945	Sunk 3 May 1945
U-3033	Kriegsmarine	Type XXI	U-boat	2,067	27 February 1945	Scuttled 4 May 1945; refloated and scrapped
U-3034	Kriegsmarine	Type XXI	U-boat	2,067	31 March 1945	Scuttled 4 May 1945; refloated and scrapped
U-3035	Kriegsmarine	Type XXI	U-boat	2,067	1 March 1945	Surrendered 9 May 1945; to United Kingdom as N28; to Soviet Union 14 December 1945; named B-28 9 June 1949; stricken 25 March 1958; scrapped
U-3037	Kriegsmarine	Type XXI	U-boat	2,067	3 March 1945	Scuttled 3 May 1945
U-3038	Kriegsmarine	Type XXI	U-boat	2,067	4 March 1945	Scuttled 3 May 1945; refloated and scrapped
U-3039	Kriegsmarine	Type XXI	U-boat	2,067	8 March 1945	Scuttled 3 May 1945; refloated and scrapped
U-3040	Kriegsmarine	Type XXI	U-boat	2,067	8 March 1945	Scuttled 3 May 1945; refloated and scrapped
U-3041	Kriegsmarine	Type XXI	U-boat	2,067	10 March 1945	Surrendered 9 May 1945; to United Kingdom as N29; to Soviet Union 10 December 1945; named B-29 9 June 1949; stricken 25 September 1958; scrapped
U-3044	Kriegsmarine	Type XXI	U-boat	2,067	27 March 1945	Scuttled 5 May 1945; refloated and scrapped
U-3501	Kriegsmarine	Type XXI	U-boat	2,067	29 July 1944	Scuttled 1 or 5 May 1945; refloated and scrapped
U-3502	Kriegsmarine	Type XXI	U-boat	2,067	19 August 1944	Decommissioned 3 May 1945; scrapped
U-3503	Kriegsmarine	Type XXI	U-boat	2,067	9 September 1944	Scuttled 8 May 1945; refloated 1946; scrapped
U-3504	Kriegsmarine	Type XXI	U-boat	2,067	23 September 1944	Scuttled 2 May 1945; refloated and scrapped
U-3505	Kriegsmarine	Type XXI	U-boat	2,067	7 October 1944	Sunk 3 April 1945
U-3506	Kriegsmarine	Type XXI	U-boat	2,067	16 October 1944	Scuttled May 1945; wreck buried
U-3507	Kriegsmarine	Type XXI	U-boat	2,067	19 October 1944	Scuttled 3 May 1945; refloated and scrapped
U-3508	Kriegsmarine	Type XXI	U-boat	2,067	2 November 1944	Sunk 4 March 1945; refloated; sunk 30 March 1945
U-3509	Kriegsmarine	Type XXI	U-boat	2,067	29 January 1945	Scuttled 3 May 1945
U-3510	Kriegsmarine	Type XXI	U-boat	2,067	11 November 1944	Scuttled 5 May 1945; refloated and scrapped
U-3511	Kriegsmarine	Type XXI	U-boat	2,067	18 November 1944	Scuttled 3 May 1945; refloated and scrapped
U-3512	Kriegsmarine	Type XXI	U-boat	2,067	27 November 1944	Sunk 8 April 1945; refloated and scrapped
U-3513	Kriegsmarine	Type XXI	U-boat	2,067	2 December 1944	Scuttled 3 May 1945; refloated and scrapped
U-3514	Kriegsmarine	Type XXI	U-boat	2,067	9 December 1944	Surrendered 9 May 1945; Scuttled 12 February 1946
U-3515	Kriegsmarine	Type XXI	U-boat	2,067	14 December 1944	Surrendered 9 May 1945; to United Kingdom as N30; to Soviet Union 2 February 1946; named B-30 9 June 1949; sold for scrap 30 November 1959
U-3516	Kriegsmarine	Type XXI	U-boat	2,067	18 December 1944	Scuttled 2 May 1945; refloated and scrapped
U-3517	Kriegsmarine	Type XXI	U-boat	2,067	22 December 1944	Scuttled 2 May 1945; refloated and scrapped
U-3518	Kriegsmarine	Type XXI	U-boat	2,067	29 December 1944	Scuttled 3 May 1945; refloated and scrapped
U-3519	Kriegsmarine	Type XXI	U-boat	2,067	6 January 1945	Sunk 2 March 1945
U-3520	Kriegsmarine	Type XXI	U-boat	2,067	12 January 1945	Sunk 31 January 1945
U-3521	Kriegsmarine	Type XXI	U-boat	2,067	14 January 1945	Scuttled 2 May 1945; refloated and scrapped
U-3522	Kriegsmarine	Type XXI	U-boat	2,067	21 January 1945	Scuttled 2 May 1945; refloated and scrapped
U-3523	Kriegsmarine	Type XXI	U-boat	2,067	23 January 1945	Sunk 6 May 1945
U-3524	Kriegsmarine	Type XXI	U-boat	2,067	26 January 1945	Scuttled 5 May 1945
U-3525	Kriegsmarine	Type XXI	U-boat	2,067	31 January 1945	Scuttled 3 May 1945; refloated and scrapped
U-3526	Kriegsmarine	Type XXI	U-boat	2,067	22 March 1945	Scuttled 5 May 1945; refloated and scrapped
U-3527	Kriegsmarine	Type XXI	U-boat	2,067	10 March 1945	Scuttled 5 May 1945; refloated and scrapped
U-3528	Kriegsmarine	Type XXI	U-boat	2,067	18 March 1945	Scuttled 5 May 1945; refloated and scrapped
U-3529	Kriegsmarine	Type XXI	U-boat	2,067	22 March 1945	Scuttled 5 May 1945; refloated and scrapped
U-3530	Kriegsmarine	Type XXI	U-boat	2,067	22 March 1945	Scuttled 3 May 1945; refloated and scrapped
U-4701	Kriegsmarine	Type XXIII	coastal U-boat	254	10 January 1945	Scuttled 5 May 1945; refloated and scrapped
U-4702	Kriegsmarine	Type XXIII	coastal U-boat	254	12 January 1945	Scuttled 5 May 1945; refloated and scrapped
U-4703	Kriegsmarine	Type XXIII	coastal U-boat	254	21 January 1945	Scuttled 5 May 1945; refloated and scrapped
U-4704	Kriegsmarine	Type XXIII	coastal U-boat	254	14 March 1945	Scuttled 5 May 1945; refloated and scrapped
U-4705	Kriegsmarine	Type XXIII	coastal U-boat	254	2 February 1945	Scuttled 3 May 1945; refloated and scrapped
U-4705	Kriegsmarine	Type XXIII	coastal U-boat	254	2 February 1945	Scuttled 3 May 1945; refloated and scrapped
U-4706	Kriegsmarine	Type XXIII	coastal U-boat	254	7 February 1945	Surrendered 9 May 1945; transferred to Norway October 1948; stricken 1954; scrapped
U-4707	Kriegsmarine	Type XXIII	coastal U-boat	254	2 February 1945	Scuttled 5 May 1945; refloated and scrapped
U-4709	Kriegsmarine	Type XXIII	coastal U-boat	254	3 March 1945	Scuttled 4 May 1945; refloated and scrapped
U-4710	Kriegsmarine	Type XXIII	coastal U-boat	254	1 May 1945	Scuttled 5 May 1945; refloated and scrapped
U-4711	Kriegsmarine	Type XXIII	coastal U-boat	254	21 March 1945	Scuttled 4 May 1945; refloated and scrapped
U-4712	Kriegsmarine	Type XXIII	coastal U-boat	254	3 April 1945	Scuttled 3 May 1945; refloated and scrapped
U-D1	Kriegsmarine	H	training submarine	434	1915	Scuttled by the Netherlands; captured by Germany 1939; paid off 23 November 1943
Uarsciek	Regia Marina	Adua	coastal submarine	843	4 December 1937	Sunk 15 December 1942
UB	Kriegsmarine	Grampus	submarine	2,157	24 May 1939	Former HMS Seal, captured 5 May 1940; commissioned 30 November 1940; scuttled 3 May 1945; refloated and scrapped
Uebi Scebeli	Regia Marina	Adua	coastal submarine	843	21 December 1937	Scuttled 29 June 1940
UF	Kriegsmarine	Aurore	training submarine	1,150	5 November 1942	Scuttled 1945
UIT-22	Kriegsmarine	Liuzzi	transport submarine	1,484	22 December 1939	Formerly Italian submarine Alpino Bagnolini; seized September 1943; renamed UIT-22; sunk 11 March 1944
UIT-23	Kriegsmarine	Liuzzi	transport submarine	1,484	3 February 1940	Formerly Italian submarine Reginaldo Giuliani; seized 8 September 1943; sunk 18 February 1944
UIT-24	Kriegsmarine	Marcello	submarine	1,313	23 September 1939	Formerly Italian submarine Comandante Cappellini; seized by Japan and transferred to Germany 10 September 1943; seized by Japan 5 May 1945; commissioned as I-503 May 1945; surrendered to United States August 1945; scuttled 16 April 1946
UIT-25	Kriegsmarine	Marconi	submarine	1,490	15 May 1940	Formerly Italian submarine Luigi Torelli; seized September 1943; seized by Japan May 1945; renamed I-504; surrendered August 1945; scuttled 12 February 1946
Ula	Royal Norwegian Navy	U	submarine	730	3 April 1943	Scrapped 1965
Ullswater	Royal Navy	U	submarine	730	2 April 1941	Commissioned as P31; renamed Ullswater February 1943; renamed Uproar April 1943; sold for scrap 13 February 1946
Ultimatum	Royal Navy	U	submarine	730	29 July 1941	Sold for scrap 23 December 1949; scrapped 1950
Ultor	Royal Navy	U	submarine	730	31 December 1942	Scrapped January 1946
Umbra	Royal Navy	U	submarine	730	2 September 1941	Sold for scrap 9 July 1946
Umpire	Royal Navy	U	submarine	730	10 July 1941	Sunk in collision 19 July 1941
Una	Royal Navy	U	submarine	730	27 September 1941	Sold for scrap 11 April 1949
Unbeaten	Royal Navy	U	submarine	730	10 November 1940	Sunk 11 November 1942
Unbending	Royal Navy	U	submarine	730	5 November 1941	Sold for scrap 23 December 1949; scrapped May 1950
Unbroken	Royal Navy	U	submarine	730	29 January 1942	Transferred to Soviet Union as V-2 26 June 1944; returned 1949; scrapped May 1950
Undaunted	Royal Navy	U	submarine	730	30 December 1940	Sunk 11 May 1941
Undine	Royal Navy	U	submarine	730	21 August 1938	Scuttled 7 January 1940
Union	Royal Navy	U	submarine	730	22 February 1941	Sunk 20 July 1941
Unique	Royal Navy	U	submarine	730	27 September 1940	Missing after 9 October 1942
Unison	Royal Navy	U	submarine	730	19 February 1942	Transferred to Soviet Union as V-3 26 June 1944; returned 1949; scrapped May 1950
United	Royal Navy	U	submarine	730	2 April 1942	Scrapped February 1946
Unity	Royal Navy	U	submarine	730	5 October 1938	Sunk in collision 29 April 1940
Universal	Royal Navy	U	submarine	730	8 March 1943	Sold for scrap June 1946
Unrivalled	Royal Navy	U	submarine	730	3 May 1942	Scrapped January 1946
Unruffled	Royal Navy	U	submarine	730	9 April 1942	Scrapped January 1946
Unruly	Royal Navy	U	submarine	730	3 November 1942	Scrapped February 1946
Unseen	Royal Navy	U	submarine	730	2 July 1942	Scrapped September 1949
Unshaken	Royal Navy	U	submarine	730	21 May 1942	Scrapped March 1946
Unsparing	Royal Navy	U	submarine	730	29 November 1942	Scrapped 1946
Unswerving	Royal Navy	U	submarine	730	3 October 1943	Sold for scrap July 1949
Untamed	Royal Navy	U	submarine	730	29 November 1942	Sank in diving accident 14 April 1943; refloated 5 July 1943; recommissioned as HMS Vitality July 1944; sold for scrap 13 February 1946
Untiring	Royal Navy	U	submarine	730	9 June 1943	Loaned to Greece as Xifias July 1945; returned 1952; scuttled 25 July 1957
Upholder	Royal Navy	U	submarine	730	31 October 1940	Missing after 6 April 1942
Upright	Royal Navy	U	submarine	730	3 September 1940	Scrapped March 1946
Uproar	Royal Navy	U	submarine	730	2 April 1941	Commissioned as P31; renamed Ullswater February 1943; renamed Uproar April 1943; sold for scrap 13 February 1946
Upshot	Royal Navy	V	submarine	740	15 May 1944	Decommissioned 2 November 1949; scrapped
Upstart	Royal Navy	U	submarine	730	3 April 1943	Loaned to Greece as Amfitriti 1945–1952; scuttled 29 July 1959
Uredd	Royal Norwegian Navy	U	submarine	730	12 December 1941	Sunk 10 February 1943
Urge	Royal Navy	U	submarine	730	12 December 1940	Sunk 27 April 1942
Ursula	Royal Navy	U	submarine	730	20 December 1938	Transferred to Soviet Union as V-4 26 June 1944; returned early 1950; scrapped May 1950
Urtica	Royal Navy	V	submarine	740	20 June 1944	Scrapped 1950
Usk	Royal Navy	U	submarine	730	11 October 1940	Sunk 29 April 1941
Usurper	Royal Navy	U	submarine	730	2 February 1943	Sunk 3 October 1943
Uther	Royal Navy	U	submarine	730	15 August 1943	Scrapped April 1950
Utmost	Royal Navy	U	submarine	730	17 August 1940	Sunk 25 November 1942
Utsira	Royal Norwegian Navy	V	submarine	740	24 August 1944	Scrapped 1965
V-2	Soviet Navy	U	submarine	730	29 January 1942	Former HMS Unbroken, transferred to Soviet Union 26 June 1941; returned to United Kingdom 1949; scrapped May 1950
V-3	Soviet Navy	U	submarine	730	19 February 1942	Former HMS Unison, transferred to Soviet Union 26 June 1944; returned 1949; scrapped May 1950
V-4	Soviet Navy	U	submarine	730	20 December 1938	Former HMS Ursula, transferred to Soviet Union 28 June 1944; returned to United Kingdom early 1950; scrapped May 1950
V-80	Kriegsmarine	Type V	midget U-boat	75	Never commissioned	Launched 14 April 1940; scuttled 29 March 1945
Vagabond	Royal Navy	V	submarine	740	27 February 1945	Scrapped 1950
Vampire	Royal Navy	V	submarine	740	13 November 1943	Scrapped March 1950
Vandal	Royal Navy	U	submarine	730	20 February 1943	Sank in diving accident 24 February 1949
Varangian	Royal Navy	U	submarine	730	10 July 1943	Scrapped June 1949
Varne	Royal Navy	V	submarine	740	30 July 1944	Scrapped September 1958
Veldt	Royal Navy	V	submarine	740	1 November 1943	Transferred to Greece as Pipinos1 November 1943; returned 10 December 1957; scrapped February 1958
Velella	Regia Marina	Argo	coastal submarine	1,000	1 September 1937	Sunk 7 September 1943
Vengeful	Royal Navy	V	submarine	740	16 October 1944	Loaned to Greece as Delfin April 1945; returned 1957; scrapped March 1958
Vengeur	French Navy	Redoutable	cruiser submarine	1,968	18 December 1931	Scuttled 27 November 1942
Veniero	Regia Marina	Marcello	submarine	1,313	6 June 1938	Sunk 7 June 1942
Venturer	Royal Navy	V	submarine	740	19 August 1943	Sold to Norway as Utstein 1946; stricken January 1964; scrapped
Vénus	French Navy	Minerve	submarine	856	15 November 1936	Scuttled 27 November 1942; scrapped 1951
Vesihiisi	Finnish Navy	Vetehinen	submarine	705	2 December 1931	Decommissioned 1946; scrapped 1950s
Vesikko	Finnish Navy		coastal submarine	434	30 April 1934	Museum ship 9 July 1973
Vetehinen	Finnish Navy	Vetehinen	submarine	705	13 October 1930	Decommissioned 1946; scrapped 1950s
Vettor Pisani	Regia Marina	Pisani	submarine	1,040	16 June 1929	Stricken 23 March 1947; scrapped
Vigorous	Royal Navy	V	submarine	740	13 January 1944	Scrapped December 1949
Viking	Royal Navy	V	submarine	740	30 August 1943	Transferred to Norway as Utvær 1946
Vineyard	Royal Navy	V	submarine	740	1 August 1944	Transferred to Free French Naval Forces as Doris1 August 1944; returned 18 November 1947; scrapped June 1950
Virtue	Royal Navy	V	submarine	740	29 February 1944	Scrapped May 1946
Virulent	Royal Navy	V	submarine	740	1 October 1944	Loaned to Greece as Argonaftis 29 May 1946–3 October 1958; scrapped April 1961
Visigoth	Royal Navy	V	submarine	740	9 March 1944	Sold for scrap March 1949; scrapped April 1950
Vitality	Royal Navy	U	submarine	730	29 November 1942	Commissioned as Untamed; sank in diving accident 14 April 1943; refloated 5 July 1943; recommissioned as Vitality July 1944; sold for scrap 13 February 1946
Vivid	Royal Navy	V	submarine	740	19 January 1944	Scrapped October 1950
Volatile	Royal Navy	V	submarine	740	4 November 1944	Loaned to Greece as Triaina May 1946; returned 3 October 1958; scrapped December 1958
Voracious	Royal Navy	V	submarine	740	13 April 1944	Scrapped May 1946
Vortice	Regia Marina	Flutto	submarine	1,093	23 February 1943	Stricken 1 August 1967
Votary	Royal Navy	V	submarine	740	13 December 1944	Transferred to Norway as Uthaug July 1946
Vox (P67)	Royal Navy	U	submarine	740	2 May 1943	Loaned to Free French Naval Forces 2 May 1943; returned July 1946; scrapped May 1949
Vox (P73)	Royal Navy	V	submarine	740	20 December 1943	Scrapped October 1946
Vulpine	Royal Navy	V	submarine	740	2 June 1944	Loaned to Denmark as U 2 (later renamed Støren) 1947–1958; scrapped June 1959
Wahoo	United States Navy	Gato	fleet submarine	2,424	15 May 1942	Sunk 11 October 1943
Whale	United States Navy	Gato	fleet submarine	2,424	1 June 1942	Sold for scrap 14 October 1960
Wilk	Polish Navy	Wilk	submarine	1,250	31 October 1931	Decommissioned 2 April 1942; scrapped 1954
Wirun	Royal Thai Navy	Matchanu	submarine	420	19 July 1938	Scrapped 1952
Volframio	Regia Marina	Acciaio	coastal submarine	864	15 February 1942	Scuttled 9 September 1943; refloated; sunk 1944
X3	Royal Navy	X	midget submarine	30	1944	Paid off 1945
X4	Royal Navy	X	midget submarine	30	1944	Paid off 1945
X5	Royal Navy	X	midget submarine	30	1944	Sunk 22 September 1943
X6	Royal Navy	X	midget submarine	30	1944	Scuttled 22 September 1943
X7	Royal Navy	X	midget submarine	30	1944	Scuttled 22 September 1943
X8	Royal Navy	X	midget submarine	30	1944	Scuttled 17 September 1943
X9	Royal Navy	X	midget submarine	30	1944	Foundered under tow 16 September 1943
X10	Royal Navy	X	midget submarine	30	1944	Scuttled 3 October 1943
X20	Royal Navy	X	midget submarine	30	1944	Paid off
X21	Royal Navy	X	midget submarine	30	1944	
X22	Royal Navy	X	midget submarine	30	1944	Sank in training 7 February 1944
X23	Royal Navy	X	midget submarine	30	1944	Paid off 1945
X24	Royal Navy	X	midget submarine	30	1944	Paid off 1945
X25	Royal Navy	X	midget submarine	30	1944	Paid off 1945
XE1	Royal Navy	XE	midget submarine	33	1944	Paid off 1945
XE2	Royal Navy	XE	midget submarine	33	1944	Paid off 1945
XE3	Royal Navy	XE	midget submarine	33	1944	Paid off 1945
XE4	Royal Navy	XE	midget submarine	33	1944	Paid off 1945
XE5	Royal Navy	XE	midget submarine	33	1944	Paid off 1945
XE6	Royal Navy	XE	midget submarine	33	1944	Paid off 1945
XE7	Royal Navy	XE	midget submarine	33	1944	Paid off 1952
XE8	Royal Navy	XE	midget submarine	33	1944	Paid off 1952
XE9	Royal Navy	XE	midget submarine	33	1944	Paid off 1952
XE10	Royal Navy	XE	midget submarine	33	1944	Paid off 1945
XE11	Royal Navy	XE	midget submarine	33	1944	Sunk in collision 6 March 1945; later salvaged
XE12	Royal Navy	XE	midget submarine	33	1944	Paid off 1952
Xifias	Royal Hellenic Navy	U	submarine	730	9 June 1943	Formerly HMS Untiring; loaned to Greece July 1945; returned to United Kingdom 1952; scuttled 25 July 1957
XT1	Royal Navy	X	training submarine	30	1944	Paid off 1945
XT2	Royal Navy	X	training submarine	30	1944	Paid off 1945
XT3	Royal Navy	X	training submarine	30	1944	Paid off 1945
XT4	Royal Navy	X	training submarine	30	1944	Paid off 1945
XT5	Royal Navy	X	training submarine	30	1944	Paid off 1945
XT6	Royal Navy	X	training submarine	30	1944	Paid off 1945
Yakobinets	Soviet Navy	Dekabrist	submarine	1,354	15 November 1930	Scuttled 12 November 1941; refloated post-war; scrapped
Yu 1	Imperial Japanese Army	Yu I type	transport submarine	346	Between 22 and 31 December 1943	Sunk 2 January 1945
Yu 2	Imperial Japanese Army	Yu I type	transport submarine	346	Late 1943–early 1944	Sunk 28 November 1944
Yu 3	Imperial Japanese Army	Yu I type	transport submarine	346	Late 1943–early 1944	Scuttled 5 January 1945; refloated by U.S. Navy 18 January 1945; subsequently scuttled or scrapped
Yu 4	Imperial Japanese Army	Yu I type	transport submarine	346		Surrendered August 1945; subsequently scuttled or scrapped
Yu 5	Imperial Japanese Army	Yu I type	transport submarine	346		Surrendered August 1945; subsequently scuttled or scrapped
Yu 6	Imperial Japanese Army	Yu I type	transport submarine	346		Surrendered August 1945; subsequently scuttled or scrapped
Yu 7	Imperial Japanese Army	Yu I type	transport submarine	346		Surrendered August 1945; subsequently scuttled or scrapped
Yu 8	Imperial Japanese Army	Yu I type	transport submarine	346		Surrendered August 1945; subsequently scuttled or scrapped
Yu 9	Imperial Japanese Army	Yu I type	transport submarine	346		Surrendered August 1945; subsequently scuttled or scrapped
Yu 10	Imperial Japanese Army	Yu I type	transport submarine	346		Surrendered August 1945; sank in storm 1945; subsequently scrapped
Yu 11	Imperial Japanese Army	Yu I type	transport submarine	346		Surrendered August 1945; sank in storm 1945; subsequently scrapped
Yu 12	Imperial Japanese Army	Yu I type	transport submarine	346		Surrendered August 1945; sank in storm 1945; subsequently scrapped
Yu 13	Imperial Japanese Army	Yu I type	transport submarine	346		Surrendered August 1945; sank in storm 1945; subsequently scrapped
Yu 14	Imperial Japanese Army	Yu I type	transport submarine	346		Surrendered August 1945; sank in storm 1945; subsequently scrapped
Yu 15	Imperial Japanese Army	Yu I type	transport submarine	346		Surrendered August 1945; subsequently scuttled or scrapped
Yu 16	Imperial Japanese Army	Yu I type	transport submarine	346		Surrendered August 1945; subsequently scuttled or scrapped
Yu 17	Imperial Japanese Army	Yu I type	transport submarine	346		Surrendered August 1945; subsequently scuttled or scrapped
Yu 18	Imperial Japanese Army	Yu I type	transport submarine	346		Surrendered August 1945; subsequently scuttled or scrapped
Yu 19	Imperial Japanese Army	Yu I type	transport submarine	346		Surrendered August 1945; subsequently scuttled or scrapped
Yu 20	Imperial Japanese Army	Yu I type	transport submarine	346		Surrendered August 1945; subsequently scuttled or scrapped
Yu 21	Imperial Japanese Army	Yu I type	transport submarine	346		Surrendered August 1945; subsequently scuttled or scrapped
Yu 22	Imperial Japanese Army	Yu I type	transport submarine	346		Surrendered August 1945; subsequently scuttled or scrapped
Yu 23	Imperial Japanese Army	Yu I type	transport submarine	346		Surrendered August 1945; subsequently scuttled or scrapped
Yu 24	Imperial Japanese Army	Yu I type	transport submarine	346		Lost in accident 1945
Yu 1001	Imperial Japanese Army	Yu I type	transport submarine	346	15 June 1944	Sunk 12 August 1945
Yu 1002	Imperial Japanese Army	Yu I type	transport submarine	346		Surrendered August 1945; subsequently scuttled or scrapped
Yu 1003	Imperial Japanese Army	Yu I type	transport submarine	346		Surrendered August 1945; subsequently scuttled or scrapped
Yu 1005	Imperial Japanese Army	Yu I type	transport submarine	346		Surrendered August 1945; subsequently scuttled or scrapped
Yu 1006	Imperial Japanese Army	Yu I type	transport submarine	346		Surrendered August 1945; subsequently scuttled or scrapped
Yu 1007	Imperial Japanese Army	Yu I type	transport submarine	346		Surrendered August 1945; sank in storm 1945 or 1946; scrapped January 1948
Yu 1008	Imperial Japanese Army	Yu I type	transport submarine	346		Surrendered August 1945; subsequently scuttled or scrapped
Yu 1009	Imperial Japanese Army	Yu I type	transport submarine	346		Surrendered August 1945; subsequently scuttled or scrapped
Yu 1010	Imperial Japanese Army	Yu I type	transport submarine	346		Surrendered August 1945; subsequently scuttled or scrapped
Yu 2001	Imperial Japanese Army	Yu I type	transport submarine	346		Surrendered August 1945; subsequently scuttled or scrapped
Yu 2002	Imperial Japanese Army	Yu I type	transport submarine	346		Surrendered August 1945; subsequently scuttled or scrapped
Yu 3001	Imperial Japanese Army	Yu I type	transport submarine	346	2 August 1944	Surrendered August 1945; subsequently scuttled or scrapped
Yu 3002	Imperial Japanese Army	Yu I type	transport submarine	346		Sank in storm 1945
Yu 3003	Imperial Japanese Army	Yu I type	transport submarine	346		Surrendered August 1945; subsequently scuttled or scrapped
Zaffiro	Regia Marina	Sirena	coastal submarine	837	4 June 1934	Sunk 9 June 1942
Żbik	Polish Navy	Wilk	submarine	1,250	1932	Interned 25 September 1939; decommissioned 1955; scrapped 1956
Zoea	Regia Marina	Foca	minelayer submarine	1,625	12 February 1938	Stricken 23 March 1947
Zwaardvisch	Royal Netherlands Navy	T	submarine	1,560	23 November 1943	Sold for scrap 12 July 1963

== See also ==
- Submarines of the Imperial Japanese Navy
- List of specifications of submarines of World War II
- List of ships of World War II
- List of World War II ships of less than 1000 tons
- List of World War I submarines
