= Italian submarine Filippo Corridoni =

Bragadin-class submarine

History

Kingdom of Italy
- Name: Filippo Corridoni
- Builder: Cantieri navali Tosi di Taranto, Taranto
- Laid down: 4 July 1927
- Launched: 30 March 1930
- Completed: 17 November 1931
- Stricken: 1 February 1948
- Fate: Scrapped

General characteristics (after modification)
- Class & type: Bragadin-class submarine
- Type: Submarine minelayer
- Displacement: 846 t (833 long tons) (surfaced); 997 t (981 long tons) (submerged)
- Length: 68 m (223 ft 1 in)
- Beam: 7.1 m (23 ft)
- Draft: 4.3 m (14 ft 1 in)
- Installed power: 1,500 bhp (1,100 kW) (diesels); 1,100 hp (820 kW) (electric motors)
- Propulsion: 2 shafts; diesel-electric; 2 × diesel engines; 2 × electric motors
- Speed: 11.5 knots (21.3 km/h; 13.2 mph) (surfaced); 7 knots (13 km/h; 8.1 mph) (submerged)
- Range: 4,180 nmi (7,740 km; 4,810 mi) at 4.5 knots (8.3 km/h; 5.2 mph) (surfaced); 86 nmi (159 km; 99 mi) at 2.2 knots (4.1 km/h; 2.5 mph) (submerged)
- Test depth: 90 m (300 ft)
- Crew: 56
- Armament: 1 × single 102 mm (4 in) deck gun; 2 × single 13.2 mm (0.52 in) machine guns; 4 × bow 533 mm (21 in) torpedo tubes; 2 × stern mine tubes; 16 or 24 naval mines

Filippo Corridoni was one of two Bragadin-class submarines built for the Regia Marina (Royal Italian Navy) during the late 1920s. The boat participated in the Second World War and was discarded in 1948.

== Design and description ==
The Bragadin-class submarines were essentially minelaying versions of the earlier Pisani class. They shared that class's problems with stability and had to be modified to correct those problems after completion. They displaced 981 metric tons (966 long tons) surfaced and 1,167 metric tons (1,149 long tons) submerged. As built the submarines were 71.5 meters (234 ft 7 in) long, had a beam of 6.15 meters (20 ft 2 in) and a draft of 4.8 meters (16 ft). In 1935 the stern was shortened and the boats were bulged to improve their stability. They now measured 68 meters (223 ft) in length and had a beam of 7.1 meters (23 ft 4 in) and draft of 4.3 meters (14 ft 1 in). They had an operational diving depth of 90 meters (300 ft). Their crew numbered 56 officers and enlisted men.

For surface running, the boats were powered by two 750-brake-horsepower (559 kW) diesel engines, each driving one propeller shaft. When submerged each propeller was driven by a 500-brake-horsepower (373 kW) electric motor. They could reach 11.5 knots (21.3 km/h; 13.2 mph) on the surface and 7 knots (13 km/h; 8.1 mph) underwater. On the surface, the Bragadin class had a range of 4,180 nautical miles (7,740 km; 4,810 mi) at 6.5 knots (12.0 km/h; 7.5 mph), submerged, they had a range of 86 nmi (159 km; 99 mi) at 2.2 knots (4.1 km/h; 2.5 mph).

The boats were armed with four internal 53.3 cm (21 in) torpedo tubes in the bow for which they carried six torpedoes. In the stern were two tubes which could accommodate a total of 16 or 24 naval mines, depending on the type. They were also armed with one 102 mm (4 in) deck gun for combat on the surface. Their anti-aircraft armament consisted of two 13.2 mm (0.52 in) machine guns.

== Construction and career ==
Filippo Corridoni was laid down by Cantieri navali Tosi di Taranto at their Taranto shipyard on 4 July 1927, launched on 30 March 1930 and completed on 17 November 1931.

== Bibliography ==
- Bagnasco, Erminio (1977). Submarines of World War Two. Annapolis, Maryland: Naval Institute Press. ISBN 0-87021-962-6.
- Brescia, Maurizio (2012). Mussolini's Navy: A Reference Guide to the Regina Marina 1930–45. Annapolis, Maryland: Naval Institute Press. ISBN 978-1-59114-544-8.
- Chesneau, Roger, ed. (1980). Conway's All the World's Fighting Ships 1922–1946. Greenwich, UK: Conway Maritime Press. ISBN 0-85177-146-7.
- Fraccaroli, Aldo (1968). Italian Warships of World War II. Shepperton, UK: Ian Allan. ISBN 0-7110-0002-6.
- Rohwer, Jürgen (2005). Chronology of the War at Sea 1939–1945: The Naval History of World War Two (Third Revised ed.). Annapolis, Maryland: Naval Institute Press. ISBN 1-59114-119-2.
- Colombo, Lorenzo (May 24, 2024). "R.Smg. Filippo Corridoni". regiamarina.net. Cristiano D'Adamo. "Operational History"
