= Italian submarine Giovanni Bausan =

Italian submarine

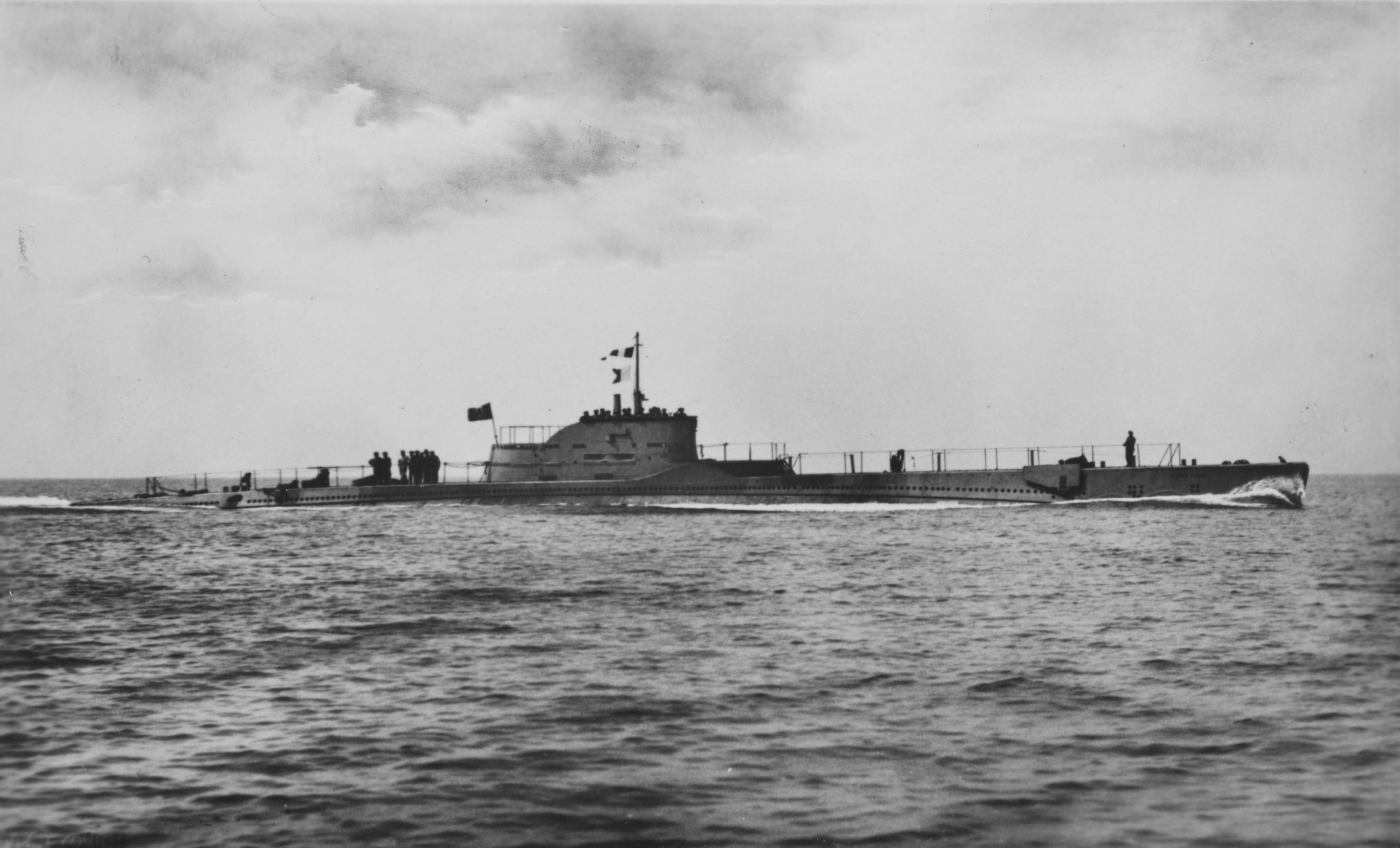
- Vettore Pisani on the surface

History
- Name: Giovanni Bausan
- Builder: Cantiere Navale Triestino, Trieste
- Laid down: 27 January 1926
- Launched: 24 March 1928
- Completed: 15 September 1929
- Decommissioned: 16 April 1942
- Fate: Scrapped

General characteristics
- Class & type: Pisani-class submarine
- Displacement: 866 long tons (880 t) surfaced; 1,040 long tons (1,057 t) submerged
- Length: 68.2 m (223 ft 9 in)
- Beam: 6.09 m (20 ft)
- Draught: 4.93 m (16 ft 2 in)
- Installed power: 3,000 bhp (2,200 kW) (diesels); 1,100 hp (820 kW) (electric motors)
- Propulsion: 2 shafts; diesel-electric; 2 × diesel engines; 2 × electric motors
- Speed: 15 knots (28 km/h; 17 mph) surfaced; 8.2 knots (15.2 km/h; 9.4 mph) submerged
- Range: 5,000 nmi (9,300 km; 5,800 mi) at 8 knots (15 km/h; 9.2 mph); 70 nmi (130 km; 81 mi) at 4 knots (7.4 km/h; 4.6 mph)
- Test depth: 90 m (300 ft)
- Complement: 48
- Armament: 6 × 21 in (533 mm) torpedo tubes (4 bow, 2 stern); 1 × 102 mm (4 in) deck gun; 2 × 13.2 mm (0.52 in) machine guns

Giovanni Bausan was one of four Pisani-class submarines built for the Regia Marina (Royal Italian Navy) during the late 1920s. Due to her age, her usefulness was limited, and she saw no real service during the war. The submarine was decommissioned in 1942 and converted into an oil barge.

== Design and description ==
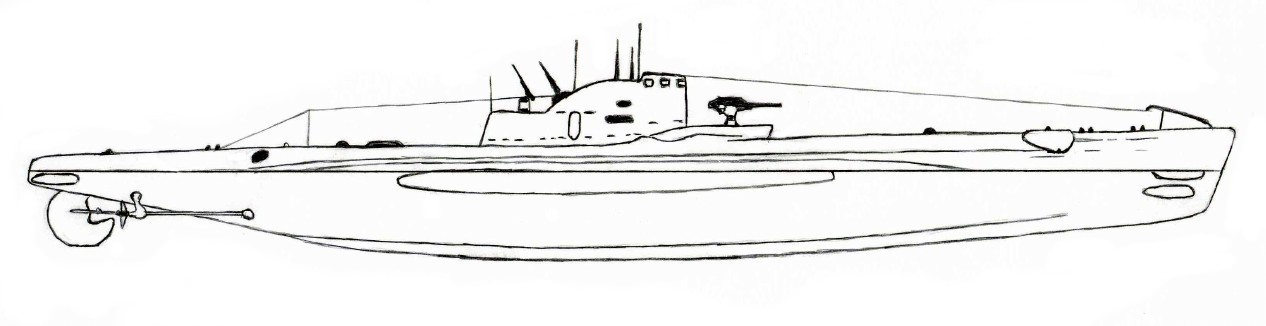
Right-profile line drawing of the Pisani class

Designed in parallel with the Mameli-class submarines, the Pisani class was larger accommodate more fuel and give them more range. They displaced 880 metric tons (866 long tons) surfaced and 1,057 metric tons (1,040 long tons) submerged. The submarines were 68.2 meters (223 ft 9 in) long, had a beam of 6.09 meters (20 ft) and a draft of 4.93 meters (16 ft 2 in). They had an operational diving depth of 90 meters (300 ft). Their crew numbered 48 officers and enlisted men.

For surface running, the boats were powered by two 1,500-brake-horsepower (1,119 kW) diesel engines, each driving one propeller shaft. When submerged each propeller was driven by a 550-horsepower (410 kW) electric motor. They could reach 15 knots (28 km/h; 17 mph) on the surface and 8.2 knots (15.2 km/h; 9.4 mph) underwater. On the surface, the Pisani class had a range of 5,000 nautical miles (9,300 km; 5,800 mi) at 8 knots (15 km/h; 9.2 mph); submerged, they had a range of 70 nmi (130 km; 81 mi) at 4 knots (7.4 km/h; 4.6 mph).

The boats were armed with six 53.3-centimeter (21 in) torpedo tubes, four in the bow and two in the stern for which they carried a total of nine torpedoes. They were also armed with a single 102-millimeter (4 in) deck gun forward of the conning tower for combat on the surface. Their anti-aircraft armament consisted of two 13.2-millimeter (0.52 in) machine guns.

== Construction and career ==
Giovanni Bausan was laid down by Cantiere Navale Triestino in their Trieste shipyard on 27 January 1926, launched on 24 March 1928, and completed on 15 September 1929.

Converted in 1942 into oil barge G.R.251 at Pola Naval Base for use in transportation of liquid fuels to Libya. Work continued when the collapse of Libyan front rendered her useless. Found at Brindisi during Italian armistice and sunk as target by the Allies off Barletta on June 9, 1944.
