= Italian submarine Santorre Santarosa =

Italian submarine

History

Kingdom of Italy
- Name: Santorre Santarosa
- Builder: Odero-Terni-Orlando, Muggiano
- Laid down: 1928
- Launched: 22 October 1929
- Completed: 1929
- Fate: Scuttled, 20 January 1943

General characteristics
- Class & type: Bandiera-class submarine
- Displacement: 940 t (925 long tons) (surfaced); 1,097 t (1,080 long tons) (submerged)
- Length: 69.8 m (229 ft 0 in)
- Beam: 7.3 m (23 ft 11 in)
- Draft: 5.26 m (17 ft 3 in)
- Installed power: 3,000 bhp (2,200 kW) (diesels); 1,300 hp (970 kW) (electric motors)
- Propulsion: 2 shafts; diesel-electric; 2 × diesel engines; 2 × electric motors
- Speed: 15 knots (28 km/h; 17 mph) (surfaced); 8.2 knots (15.2 km/h; 9.4 mph) (submerged)
- Range: 4,750 nmi (8,800 km; 5,470 mi) at 8 knots (15 km/h; 9.2 mph) (surfaced); 60 nmi (110 km; 69 mi) at 4 knots (7.4 km/h; 4.6 mph) (submerged)
- Test depth: 90 m (300 ft)
- Armament: 1 × single 102 mm (4 in) deck gun; 2 × single 13.2 mm (0.52 in) machine guns; 8 × 533 mm (21 in) torpedo tubes (4 bow, 4 stern)

Santorre di Santarosa was one of four Bandiera-class submarines built for the Regia Marina (Royal Italian Navy) during the late 1920s. Completed in 1929, she played a minor role in the Spanish Civil War of 1936–1939 supporting the Spanish Nationalists.

== Design and description ==
The Bandiera class was an improved and enlarged version of the preceding Pisani-class submarines. They displaced 940 metric tons (925 long tons) surfaced and 1,097 metric tons (1,080 long tons) submerged. The submarines were 69.8 meters (229 ft 0 in) long, had a beam of 7.3 meters (23 ft 11 in) and a draft of 5.26 meters (17 ft 3 in). They had an operational diving depth of 90 meters (300 ft). Their crew numbered 53 officers and enlisted men.

For surface running, the boats were powered by two 1,500-brake-horsepower (1,119 kW) diesel engines, each driving one propeller shaft. When submerged each propeller was driven by a 650-horsepower (485 kW) electric motor. They could reach 15 knots (28 km/h; 17 mph) on the surface and 8.2 knots (15.2 km/h; 9.4 mph) underwater. On the surface, the Bandiera class had a range of 4,750 nautical miles (8,800 km; 5,470 mi) at 8.5 knots (15.7 km/h; 9.8 mph); submerged, they had a range of 60 nmi (110 km; 69 mi) at 4 knots (7.4 km/h; 4.6 mph).

The boats were armed with eight 53.3-centimeter (21 in) torpedo tubes, four each in the bow and stern for which they carried a total of 12 torpedoes. They were also armed with a single 102-millimeter (4 in) deck gun forward of the conning tower for combat on the surface. Their anti-aircraft armament consisted of two 13.2-millimeter (0.52 in) machine guns.

== Construction and career ==
Santorre Santarosa was laid down by Odero-Terni-Orlando at their Muggiano shipyard in 1928, launched on 22 October 1929 and completed later that year. During the Spanish Civil War, Santorre Santarosa was attempting to attack the 7,932-gross register ton (GRT) tanker SS Campeador during nightfall on 11 August 1937 off Ras el Mustafa, French Tunisia, when the Italian destroyer Saetta torpedoed and sank the tanker before the submarine could reach firing position.
