= Italian submarine Ciro Menotti =

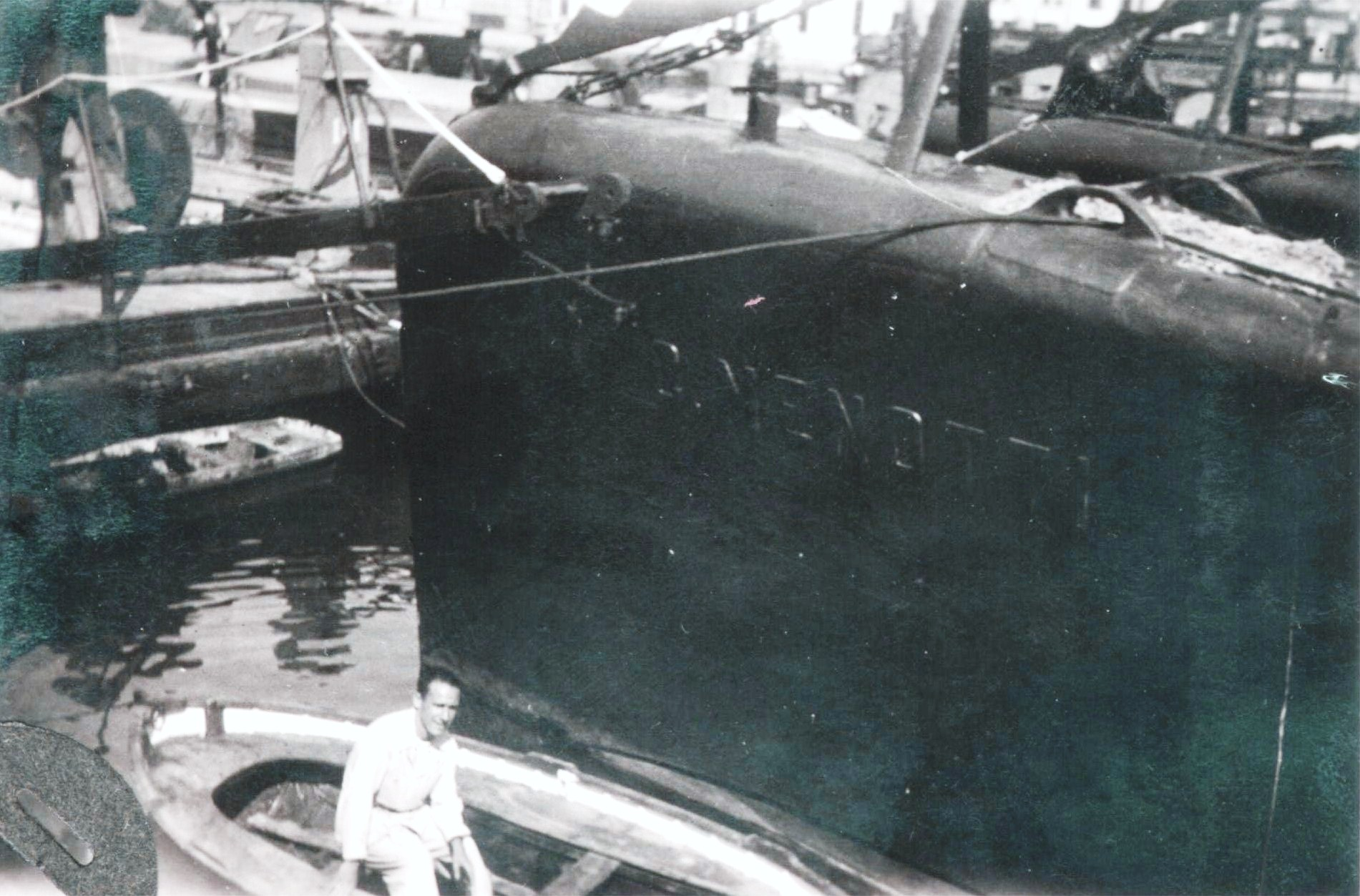

History

Kingdom of Italy
- Name: Ciro Menotti
- Namesake: Ciro Menotti
- Builder: Odero-Terni-Orlando, Muggiano
- Laid down: 1928
- Launched: 29 December 1929
- Completed: 1929
- Fate: Scrapped 1 February 1948

General characteristics
- Class & type: Bandiera-class submarine
- Displacement: 940 t (925 long tons) (surfaced); 1,097 t (1,080 long tons) (submerged)
- Length: 69.8 m (229 ft 0 in)
- Beam: 7.3 m (23 ft 11 in)
- Draft: 5.26 m (17 ft 3 in)
- Installed power: 3,000 bhp (2,200 kW) (diesels); 1,300 hp (970 kW) (electric motors)
- Propulsion: 2 shafts; diesel-electric; 2 × diesel engines; 2 × electric motors
- Speed: 15 knots (28 km/h; 17 mph) (surfaced); 8.2 knots (15.2 km/h; 9.4 mph) (submerged)
- Range: 4,750 nmi (8,800 km; 5,470 mi) at 8 knots (15 km/h; 9.2 mph) (surfaced); 60 nmi (110 km; 69 mi) at 4 knots (7.4 km/h; 4.6 mph) (submerged)
- Test depth: 90 m (300 ft)
- Armament: 1 × single 102 mm (4 in) deck gun; 2 × single 13.2 mm (0.52 in) machine guns; 8 × 533 mm (21 in) torpedo tubes (4 bow, 4 stern)

Ciro Menotti was one of four Bandiera-class submarine built for the Regia Marina (Royal Italian Navy) during the late 1920s. Completed in 1929, she played a minor role in the battle of Malaga during the Spanish Civil War of 1936–1939 supporting the Spanish Nationalists. Ciro Menotti carried out a number of resupply missions during World War II.

== Design and description ==
The Bandiera class was an improved and enlarged version of the preceding Pisani-class submarines. They displaced 940 metric tons (925 long tons) surfaced and 1,097 metric tons (1,080 long tons) submerged. The submarines were 69.8 meters (229 ft 0 in) long, had a beam of 7.3 meters (23 ft 11 in) and a draft of 5.26 meters (17 ft 3 in). They had an operational diving depth of 90 meters (300 ft). Their crew numbered 53 officers and enlisted men.

For surface running, the boats were powered by two 1,500-brake-horsepower (1,119 kW) diesel engines, each driving one propeller shaft. When submerged each propeller was driven by a 650-horsepower (485 kW) electric motor. They could reach 15 knots (28 km/h; 17 mph) on the surface and 8.2 knots (15.2 km/h; 9.4 mph) underwater. On the surface, the Bandiera class had a range of 4,750 nautical miles (8,800 km; 5,470 mi) at 8.5 knots (15.7 km/h; 9.8 mph); submerged, they had a range of 60 nmi (110 km; 69 mi) at 4 knots (7.4 km/h; 4.6 mph).

The boats were armed with eight 53.3-centimeter (21 in) torpedo tubes, four each in the bow and stern for which they carried a total of 12 torpedoes. They were also armed with a single 102-millimeter (4 in) deck gun forward of the conning tower for combat on the surface. Their anti-aircraft armament consisted of two 13.2-millimeter (0.52 in) machine guns.

== Construction and career ==
Ciro Menotti was laid down by Odero-Terni-Orlando at their Muggiano shipyard in 1928, launched on 29 December 1929 and completed later that year. During the Spanish Civil War, Ciro Menotti made a patrol off Málaga in early 1937 during which she sank the Republican 1,254-gross register ton (GRT) mail steamer SS Delfin off Torrox on the night of 31 January–1 February. The submarine bombarded roads and bridges around Málaga over the next several days in support of the Nationalist assault on the city.

After the entry of Italy in World War II, Ciro Menotti was used in resupply missions to North Africa and Albania until 1942, when she was assigned for training. Ciro Menotti was interned in Malta in September 1943 following the Cassabile Armistice, and finally scrapped on 1 February 1948.
