= Vettor Pisani (disambiguation) =

Vettor Pisani may refer to:

- Vettor Pisani, a Venetian admiral
- Italian submarine Vettor Pisani
- Italian cruiser Vettor Pisani, armoured cruiser built for the Royal Italian Navy
- Vettor Pisani (corvette), Italian naval corvette that left Italy in 1882 for a three-year scientific voyage round the world.
