= Italian submarine Giovanni da Procida =

Italian submarine

History

Kingdom of Italy
- Name: Giovanni Da Procida
- Builder: Cantieri navali Tosi di Taranto, Taranto
- Laid down: 1925
- Launched: 1 April 1928
- Completed: 1929
- Fate: Discarded, 1 February 1948

General characteristics
- Type: Mameli-class submarine
- Displacement: 823 t (810 long tons) (surfaced); 1,009 t (993 long tons) (submerged)
- Length: 64.6 m (212 ft)
- Beam: 6.51 m (21 ft 4 in)
- Draft: 4.3 m (14 ft 1 in)
- Installed power: 1,550 bhp (1,160 kW) (diesels); 550 hp (410 kW) (electric motors)
- Propulsion: 2 shafts; diesel-electric; 2 × diesel engines; 2 × electric motors
- Speed: 15 knots (28 km/h; 17 mph) (surfaced); 8 knots (15 km/h; 9.2 mph) (submerged)
- Range: 4,360 nmi (8,070 km; 5,020 mi) at 8 knots (15 km/h; 9.2 mph) (surfaced); 110 nmi (200 km; 130 mi) at 3 knots (5.6 km/h; 3.5 mph) (submerged)
- Test depth: 90 m (300 ft)
- Armament: 1 × single 102 mm (4 in) deck gun; 2 × single 13.2 mm (0.52 in) machine guns; 6 × 533 mm (21 in) torpedo tubes (4 bow, 2 stern)

Giovanni Da Procida was one of four Mameli-class submarines built for the Regia Marina (Royal Italian Navy) during the 1920s. She played a minor role in the Spanish Civil War of 1936–1939 supporting the Spanish Nationalists. She was named for John of Procida (1210–1298), a diplomat and physician who served Emperor Frederick II.

== Design and description ==
The Mameli class was one of the Regia Marina's first classes of submarines to be built after the First World War. They displaced 823 metric tons (810 long tons) surfaced and 1,009 metric tons (993 long tons) submerged. The submarines were 64.6 meters (211 ft 11 in) long, had a beam of 6.51 meters (21 ft 4 in) and a draft of 4.3 meters (14 ft 1 in). They had an operational diving depth of 90 meters (300 ft). Their crew numbered 49 officers and enlisted men.

For surface running, the boats were powered by two 1,550-brake-horsepower (1,156 kW) diesel engines, each driving one propeller shaft. When submerged each propeller was driven by a 550-horsepower (410 kW) electric motor. They could reach 15 knots (28 km/h; 17 mph) on the surface and 7.2 knots (13.3 km/h; 8.3 mph) underwater. On the surface, the Mameli class had a range of 4,360 nautical miles (8,070 km; 5,020 mi) at 8 knots (15 km/h; 9.2 mph); submerged, they had a range of 110 nmi (200 km; 130 mi) at 3 knots (5.6 km/h; 3.5 mph).

The boats were armed with six 53.3-centimeter (21 in) torpedo tubes, four in the bow and two in the stern for which they carried a total of 10 torpedoes. They were also armed with a single 102-millimeter (4 in) deck gun forward of the conning tower for combat on the surface. Their anti-aircraft armament consisted of two single 13.2-millimeter (0.52 in) machine guns.

== Construction and career ==
Giovanni Da Procida was laid down by Cantieri navali Tosi di Taranto at their Taranto shipyard in 1925, launched on 1 April 1928 and completed in 1929. During the Spanish Civil War, the submarine unsuccessfully attacked a ship in the Aegean Sea during a patrol on 24 August–4 September 1937.

At the outbreak of World War II, the vessel was stationed in Messina as part of the 31st Squadron of the III Group.

Under the command of Lieutenant Commander Guido d'Alterio, she completed a total of 16 offensive missions in the Strait of Sicily, the waters of Malta, the Dodecanese, the Strait of Otranto, and Liguria.

From April 1941 to February 1942, based in La Spezia, she operated for experiments and anti-submarine training for naval air units. From February 9, 1942, until the end of August, she was drydocked in Taranto for conversion work. Her engines were also replaced.

At the time of the 1943 armistice, Giovanni da Procida was still under repair in Taranto, and became part of the "co-belligerent" Italian Navy, which served with the Allies.

Her refit was finally completed in May 1944, and under the command of Lieutenant Francesco Castracane degli Antelminelli, she conducted trials off Taranto.

In August-September 1944, Giovanni da Procida sailed to Bermuda. From October 1944 to February 1945, she participated in anti-submarine training exercises with the US Navy.

She returned to Taranto on 3 November 1945. She was decommissioned in 1948.
