= Italian submarine Goffredo Mameli =

Italian submarine

History

Kingdom of Italy
- Name: Goffredo Mameli
- Builder: Cantieri navali Tosi di Taranto, Taranto
- Laid down: 1925
- Launched: 9 December 1926
- Completed: 1929
- Fate: Discarded, 1 February 1948

General characteristics
- Type: Mameli-class submarine
- Displacement: 823 t (810 long tons) (surfaced); 1,009 t (993 long tons) (submerged)
- Length: 64.6 m (212 ft)
- Beam: 6.51 m (21 ft 4 in)
- Draft: 4.3 m (14 ft 1 in)
- Installed power: 1,550 bhp (1,160 kW) (diesels); 550 hp (410 kW) (electric motors)
- Propulsion: 2 shafts; diesel-electric; 2 × diesel engines; 2 × electric motors
- Speed: 15 knots (28 km/h; 17 mph) (surfaced); 8 knots (15 km/h; 9.2 mph) (submerged)
- Range: 4,360 nmi (8,070 km; 5,020 mi) at 8 knots (15 km/h; 9.2 mph) (surfaced); 110 nmi (200 km; 130 mi) at 3 knots (5.6 km/h; 3.5 mph) (submerged)
- Test depth: 90 m (300 ft)
- Armament: 1 × single 102 mm (4 in) deck gun; 2 × single 13.2 mm (0.52 in) machine guns; 6 × 533 mm (21 in) torpedo tubes (4 bow, 2 stern)

Goffredo Mameli was the lead ship of her class of four submarines built for the Regia Marina (Royal Italian Navy) during the 1920s.

== Design and description ==
The Mameli class was one of the Regia Marina's first classes of submarines to be built after the First World War. They displaced 823 metric tons (810 long tons) surfaced and 1,009 metric tons (993 long tons) submerged. The submarines were 64.6 meters (211 ft 11 in) long, had a beam of 6.51 meters (21 ft 4 in) and a draft of 4.3 meters (14 ft 1 in). They had an operational diving depth of 90 meters (300 ft). Their crew numbered 49 officers and enlisted men.

For surface running, the boats were powered by two 1,550-brake-horsepower (1,156 kW) diesel engines, each driving one propeller shaft. When submerged each propeller was driven by a 550-horsepower (410 kW) electric motor. They could reach 15 knots (28 km/h; 17 mph) on the surface and 7.2 knots (13.3 km/h; 8.3 mph) underwater. On the surface, the Mameli class had a range of 4,360 nautical miles (8,070 km; 5,020 mi) at 8 knots (15 km/h; 9.2 mph); submerged, they had a range of 110 nmi (200 km; 130 mi) at 3 knots (5.6 km/h; 3.5 mph).

The boats were armed with six 53.3-centimeter (21 in) torpedo tubes, four in the bow and two in the stern for which they carried a total of 10 torpedoes. They were also armed with a single 102-millimeter (4 in) deck gun forward of the conning tower for combat on the surface. Their anti-aircraft armament consisted of two single 13.2-millimeter (0.52 in) machine guns.

== Construction and career ==
Goffredo Mameli was laid down by Cantieri navali Tosi di Taranto at their Taranto shipyard in 1925, launched on 9 December 1926 and completed in 1929.
