= Bandiera-class submarine =

Italian submarine class

Class overview
- Operators: Regia Marina
- Preceded by: Pisani class
- Succeeded by: Squalo class
- In commission: 1930–1948
- Completed: 4
- Lost: 1
- Scrapped: 3

General characteristics
- Type: Submarine
- Displacement: 940 t (925 long tons) (surfaced); 1,097 t (1,080 long tons) (submerged)
- Length: 69.8 m (229 ft)
- Beam: 7.3 m (23 ft 11 in)
- Draft: 5.26 m (17 ft 3 in)
- Installed power: 3,000 bhp (2,200 kW) (diesels); 1,300 hp (970 kW) (electric motors)
- Propulsion: 2 shafts; diesel-electric; 2 × diesel engines; 2 × electric motors
- Speed: 15 knots (28 km/h; 17 mph) (surfaced); 8.2 knots (15.2 km/h; 9.4 mph) (submerged)
- Range: 4,750 nmi (8,800 km; 5,470 mi) at 8 knots (15 km/h; 9.2 mph) (surfaced); 60 nmi (110 km; 69 mi) at 4 knots (7.4 km/h; 4.6 mph) (submerged)
- Test depth: 90 m (300 ft)
- Crew: 53
- Armament: 1 × single 102 mm (4 in) deck gun; 2 × single 13.2 mm (0.52 in) machine guns; 8 × 533 mm (21 in) torpedo tubes (4 bow, 4 stern)

The Bandiera-class submarines were built for the Regia Marina (Royal Italian Navy) during the late 1920s. They played a minor role in the Spanish Civil War of 1936–1939 supporting the Spanish Nationalists.

== Design and description ==
The Bandiera class was an improved and enlarged version of the preceding Pisani-class submarines. They displaced 940 metric tons (925 long tons) surfaced and 1,097 metric tons (1,080 long tons) submerged. The submarines were 69.8 meters (229 ft) long, had a beam of 7.3 meters (23 ft 11 in) and a draft of 5.26 meters (17 ft 3 in). They had an operational diving depth of 90 meters (300 ft). Their crew numbered 53 officers and enlisted men.

For surface running, the boats were powered by two 1,500-brake-horsepower (1,119 kW) diesel engines, each driving one propeller shaft. When submerged each propeller was driven by a 650-horsepower (485 kW) electric motor. They could reach 15 knots (28 km/h; 17 mph) on the surface and 8.2 knots (15.2 km/h; 9.4 mph) underwater. On the surface, the Bandiera class had a range of 4,750 nautical miles (8,800 km; 5,470 mi) at 8.5 knots (15.7 km/h; 9.8 mph); submerged, they had a range of 60 nmi (110 km; 69 mi) at 4 knots (7.4 km/h; 4.6 mph).

The boats were armed with eight 53.3-centimeter (21 in) torpedo tubes, four each in the bow and stern for which they carried a total of 12 torpedoes. They were also armed with a single 102-millimeter (4 in) deck gun forward of the conning tower for combat on the surface. Their anti-aircraft armament consisted of two 13.2-millimeter (0.52 in) machine guns.

== Submarines ==
Construction details
Ship	Builder	Laid down	Launched	Commissioned	Fate
Fratelli Bandiera	Cantiere Navale Triestino, Trieste	11 February 1928	7 August 1929	2 June 1930	Discarded 1 February 1948
Luciano Manara	Cantiere Navale Triestino, Trieste	1 May 1928	5 October 1929	29 July 1930	Discarded 1 February 1948
Ciro Menotti	Odero-Terni-Orlando, Muggiano	12 May 1928	29 December 1929	29 July 1930	Discarded 1 February 1948
Santorre Santarosa	Odero-Terni-Orlando, Muggiano	1 May 1928	22 October 1929	29 July 1930	Scuttled 20 January 1943

== Service history ==
During the Spanish Civil War, Luigi Settembrini made one patrol in the Eastern Mediterranean in September 1937 during which she sank a Soviet cargo ship.
