= Italian submarine Vettor Pisani =

Italian submarine

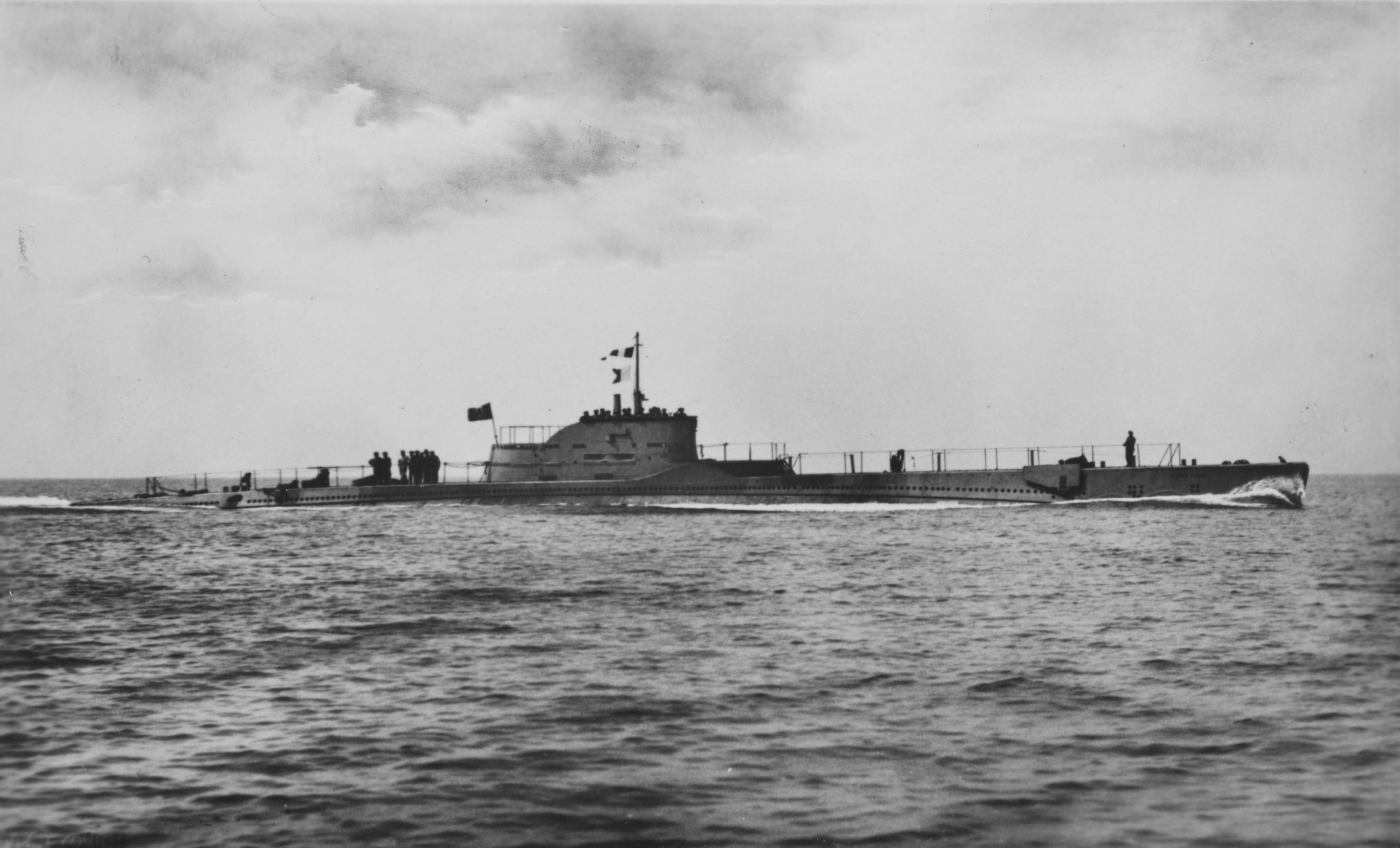
- Vettore Pisani on the surface

History
- Name: Vettor Pisani
- Namesake: Vettor Pisani
- Builder: Cantiere Navale Triestino, Trieste
- Laid down: 18 November 1925
- Launched: 24 November 1927
- Completed: 16 June 1929
- Stricken: 23 March 1947
- Fate: Scrapped

General characteristics
- Class & type: Pisani-class submarine
- Displacement: 866 long tons (880 t) surfaced; 1,040 long tons (1,057 t) submerged
- Length: 68.2 m (223 ft 9 in)
- Beam: 6.09 m (20 ft)
- Draught: 4.93 m (16 ft 2 in)
- Installed power: 3,000 bhp (2,200 kW) (diesels); 1,100 hp (820 kW) (electric motors)
- Propulsion: 2 shafts; diesel-electric; 2 × diesel engines; 2 × electric motors
- Speed: 15 knots (28 km/h; 17 mph) surfaced; 8.2 knots (15.2 km/h; 9.4 mph) submerged
- Range: 5,000 nmi (9,300 km; 5,800 mi) at 8 knots (15 km/h; 9.2 mph); 70 nmi (130 km; 81 mi) at 4 knots (7.4 km/h; 4.6 mph)
- Test depth: 90 m (300 ft)
- Complement: 48
- Armament: 6 × 21 in (530 mm) torpedo tubes (4 bow, 2 stern); 1 × 102 mm (4 in) deck gun; 2 × 13.2 mm (0.52 in) machine guns

Vettor Pisani was the lead ship of her class of four submarines built for the Regia Marina (Royal Italian Navy) during the late 1920s. She was named after Vettor Pisani, a Venetian admiral. The submarine played a minor role in the Spanish Civil War of 1936–1939 supporting the Spanish Nationalists.

Vettor Pisani briefly had Junio Valerio Borghese as commander during the Second World War. Due to her age, her usefulness was limited, and she saw no real service during the war. The submarine survived the war and was subsequently laid up on 23 March 1947.

== Design and description ==
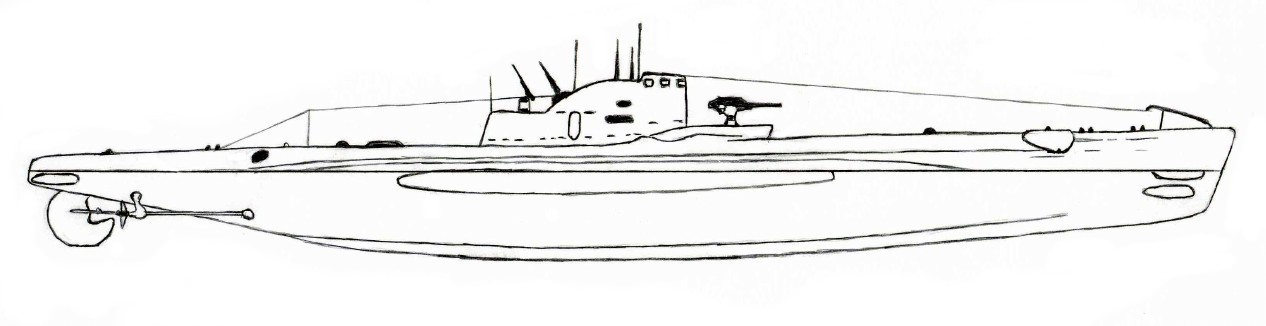
Right-profile line drawing of the Pisani class

Designed in parallel with the Mameli-class submarines, the Pisani class was larger, to accommodate more fuel and give them more range. They displaced 880 metric tons (866 long tons) surfaced and 1,057 metric tons (1,040 long tons) submerged. The submarines were 68.2 meters (223 ft 9 in) long, had a beam of 6.09 meters (20 ft) and a draft of 4.93 meters (16 ft 2 in). They had an operational diving depth of 90 meters (300 ft). Their crew numbered 48 officers and enlisted men.

For surface running, the boats were powered by two 1,500-brake-horsepower (1,119 kW) diesel engines, each driving one propeller shaft. When submerged each propeller was driven by a 550-horsepower (410 kW) electric motor. They could reach 15 knots (28 km/h; 17 mph) on the surface and 8.2 knots (15.2 km/h; 9.4 mph) underwater. On the surface, the Pisani class had a range of 5,000 nautical miles (9,300 km; 5,800 mi) at 8 knots (15 km/h; 9.2 mph); submerged, they had a range of 70 nmi (130 km; 81 mi) at 4 knots (7.4 km/h; 4.6 mph).

The boats were armed with six 53.3-centimeter (21 in) torpedo tubes, four in the bow and two in the stern for which they carried a total of nine torpedoes. They were also armed with a single 102-millimeter (4 in) deck gun forward of the conning tower for combat on the surface. Their anti-aircraft armament consisted of two 13.2-millimeter (0.52 in) machine guns.

== Construction and career ==
Vettor Pisani was laid down by Cantiere Navale Triestino in their Trieste shipyard on 18 November 1925, launched on 24 November 1927, and completed on 16 June 1929. During the Spanish Civil War, she unsuccessfully attacked a ship during a patrol she conducted off Barcelona, Spain, from 7 to 20 August 1937.
