= Italian ship Piero Foscari =

History

Italy
- Name: Piero Foscari
- Launched: 7 June 1928
- Commissioned: 1941
- Fate: Sunk, 10 September 1943

General characteristics
- Type: Auxiliary cruiser
- Tonnage: 3,423 GRT; 1,934 NRT; 2,675 DWT
- Length: 94.5 m (310 ft) p/p
- Beam: 13.5 m (44 ft)
- Depth: 7.3 m (24 ft)
- Propulsion: 2 × FIAT engines, 4,200 hp (3,132 kW), 2 shafts
- Speed: 14.5 knots (26.9 km/h; 16.7 mph)
- Capacity: 125 passengers

Piero Foscari was an Italian merchant ship and then auxiliary cruiser of the Regia Marina.

Built in 1928 for the Società Anonima di Navigazione Adriatica, it was originally a motor ship of 3,423 tons. Foscari served as a transport ship for the Regia Marina from 18 to 25 August 1940, and in 1941 was converted into an auxiliary cruiser to act as convoy escort. On 18 December 1942, while travelling from Naples to Civitavecchia, she was damaged by the torpedoes of the British minelaying submarine Rorqual.

After the Armistice with Italy of 9 September 1943, while en route from Genoa to escort the merchant ship Valverde, she was shelled by coastal artillery and attacked by three German patrol boats and the minelayers Pommern and Brandenburg. Foscari took refuge at Castiglioncello, where she was sunk at 17:30 the following day in another attack by German units.
