= Italian ship Pietro Micca =

Pietro Micca was the name of at least three ships of the Italian Navy and may refer to:

- Italian cruiser Pietro Micca, a cruiser launched in 1876 and discarded in 1893.
- Italian submarine Pietro Micca (1917), a Micca-class submarine launched in 1917 and discarded in 1930.
- Italian submarine Pietro Micca (1935), a submarine launched in 1935 and sunk in 1943.
