= HMS Rorqual (N74) =

British mine-laying submarine

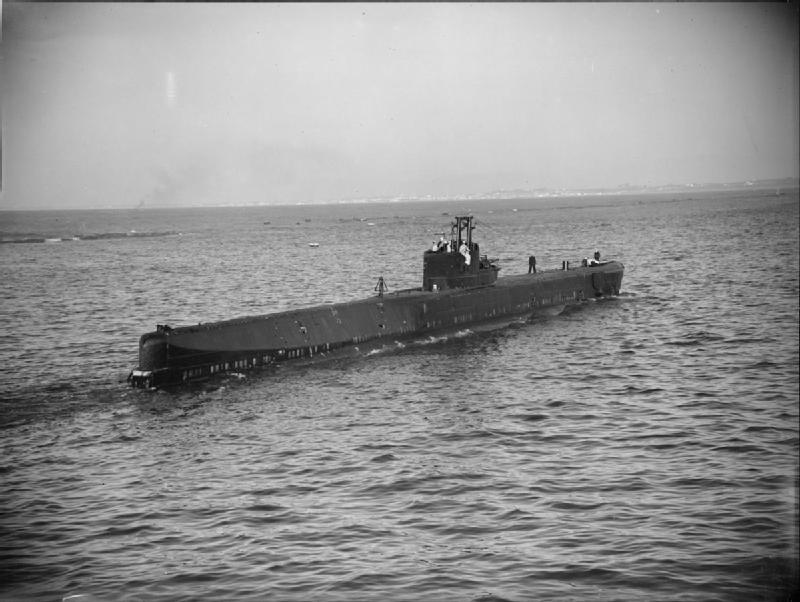
- HMS Rorqual

History

United Kingdom
- Name: HMS Rorqual
- Builder: Vickers Armstrong, Barrow
- Laid down: 1 May 1935
- Launched: 27 July 1936
- Commissioned: 10 February 1937
- Fate: Sold on 19 November 1945, broken up on 17 March 1946
- Badge

General characteristics
- Class & type: Grampus-class mine-laying submarine
- Displacement: 1,810 tons surfaced; 2,157 tons submerged
- Length: 293 ft (89 m)
- Beam: 25 ft 6 in (7.77 m)
- Draught: 16 ft 10 in (5.13 m)
- Propulsion: 2 shaft, Diesel (3300 hp) plus electric (1630 hp)
- Speed: 15.5 knots (28.7 km/h; 17.8 mph) surfaced; 8.75 knots (16.21 km/h; 10.07 mph) submerged
- Complement: 59
- Armament: 6 × 21-inch (533 mm) torpedo tubes (bow); 12 torpedoes; 1 × 4-inch (102 mm) deck gun; 50 mines

HMS Rorqual (N74) was a British mine-laying submarine, one of the six ships of the Grampus class of the Royal Navy. She was built by Vickers Armstrong, Barrow and launched 27 July 1936. She served in the Second World War in the Mediterranean and in the far east. She was the only Grampus-class submarine to survive the war, and she is considered the most successful minelaying submarine of World War II, sinking 57,704 GRT of enemy shipping, 35,951 of which through her mines.

== Career ==
=== Mediterranean ===
Sent to the Mediterranean in 1940, Rorqual began laying minefields and attacking enemy shipping. Amongst the shipping lost to mines laid by Rorqual were the Italian merchants Loasso, Celio, Leopardi, and Salpi; the Italian Navy water tankers Verde and Ticino; the Italian pilot vessel F 34 / Rina Croce, the Italian torpedo boats Calipso, Fratelli Cairoli, Generale Antonio Chinotto, Altair and Aldebaran; the Italian auxiliary submarine chaser AS 99 Zuri, the German troop transport Ankara; the French merchant (in German service), P.L.M. 24; and the French fishing vessel Coligny.

The Italian merchants Caffaro, Ischia and the brand-new Italian merchant Carbonello A. were damaged by mines laid by Rorqual. Rorqual was also active in attacking enemy shipping herself, torpedoing and sinking the Italian tanker Laura Corrado; the Italian submarine Pier Capponi; the Italian merchants Cilicia and Monstella; the German tanker Wilhemsburg and the French merchant (in German service) Nantaise. Rorqual's torpedoes also damaged the Italian auxiliary cruiser Piero Foscari, unsuccessfully attacked an Italian submarine and the Italian merchant Securitas, and sunk two Greek sailing vessels with gunfire.

In August 1940 she attacked an Italian convoy, missing the Italian merchants Verace and Doris Ursino with torpedoes. Following this failed attack Rorqual was heavily depth charged by the Italian torpedo boat Generale Achille Papa.

In January 1941 Rorqual attacked the tug Ursus and a floating battery mounted on a lighter. The lighter could not be torpedoed, as she was of too shallow draught for the normal depth setting of the torpedoes, and the only other weapon the Rorqual had was her single 4-inch gun. Rorqual surfaced at about 500 yards range. Her opening attack hit the Ursus and damaged the battery. Heavy fire from the damaged tug forced Rorqual to shift her fire from the battery and engage the Ursus again, forcing her crew to abandon her. Though badly damaged, the floating battery opened fire and forced the Rorqual to dive. She then fired a torpedo set to run on the surface, only to find that the torpedo developed a gyro failure and returned on its own tracks. Rorqual had to dive deep to avoid it. When last seen, the Ursus was sinking and the battery was on fire. The battery however did not sink, and was later towed to Dubrovnik.

Due to her large size and space within the mine casing, Rorqual was well suited to carrying stores and in June 1941, after loading at Alexandria, became the first submarine to carry supplies to the beleaguered island of Malta. In all she performed, at considerable risk to the submarine, 5 storing runs to Malta in 1941 from Alexandria and in 1942 from Beirut. These were known as "magic carpet runs". The supplies consisted mainly of aviation spirit for the Hurricane fighters defending Malta airspace, kerosene for cooking and mail. Passengers were carried in both directions. Also, in October 1943 Rorqual transported from Beirut to the island of Leros an entire battery of 40mm Bofors guns, with a jeep to tow them. This was intended to give some air defence to British troops stranded on the island under attack by German forces.

=== Far East ===
Rorqual arrived in the Far East in 1945 to operate against the Japanese, serving as part of the British Pacific Fleet. She laid minefields and sank three Japanese sailing craft and three coasters with gunfire, and damaged a fourth coaster.

== Post war ==
By the end of the war, she was the only surviving ship of the Grampus class. She was sold off, and arrived at the yards of Cashmore, Newport for breaking up on 17 March 1946.

== Bibliography ==
- Caruana, Joseph (2012). "Emergency Victualling of Malta During WWII". Warship International. LXIX (4): 357–364. ISSN 0043-0374.
- Colledge, J. J.; Warlow, Ben (2006) [1969]. Ships of the Royal Navy: The Complete Record of All Fighting Ships of the Royal Navy from the 15th Century to the Present (3rd Rev ed.). London: Chatham Publishing. ISBN 978-1-86176-281-8. OCLC 67375475.
- Frampton, Viktor & Domenico, Francesco de (2015). "Question 13/51: British Submarine Actions of WW II". Warship International. LII (2): 116–118. ISSN 0043-0374.
- Napier, Christopher (2017). HMS Rorqual: Commanded by Lennox Napier DSO DSC: June 1941–December 1943. Friends of the Royal Navy Submarine Museum.
