= Mameli-class submarine =

Italian submarine class

Class overview
- Name: Mameli class
- Builders: Cantieri navali Tosi di Taranto, Taranto
- Operators: Regia Marina
- Preceded by: Micca class
- Succeeded by: Pisani class
- Built: 1925–1929
- In commission: 1929–1948
- Completed: 4
- Lost: 1
- Scrapped: 3

General characteristics
- Type: Submarine
- Displacement: 823 t (810 long tons) (surfaced); 1,009 t (993 long tons) (submerged)
- Length: 64.6 m (212 ft)
- Beam: 6.51 m (21 ft 4 in)
- Draft: 4.3 m (14 ft 1 in)
- Installed power: 1,550 bhp (1,160 kW) (diesels); 550 hp (410 kW) (electric motors)
- Propulsion: 2 shafts; diesel-electric; 2 × diesel engines; 2 × electric motors
- Speed: 15 knots (28 km/h; 17 mph) (surfaced); 8 knots (15 km/h; 9.2 mph) (submerged)
- Range: 4,360 nmi (8,070 km; 5,020 mi) at 8 knots (15 km/h; 9.2 mph) (surfaced); 110 nmi (200 km; 130 mi) at 3 knots (5.6 km/h; 3.5 mph) (submerged)
- Test depth: 90 m (300 ft)
- Armament: 1 × single 102 mm (4 in) deck gun; 2 × single 13.2 mm (0.52 in) machine guns; 6 × 533 mm (21 in) torpedo tubes (4 bow, 2 stern)

The Mameli-class submarine was one of the first classes of the submarines to be built for the Regia Marina (Royal Italian Navy) after the First World War. Some of these boats played a minor role in the Spanish Civil War of 1936–1939 supporting the Spanish Nationalists. Of the four boats built in this class, all but one survived the Second World War.

== Design and description ==
The Mameli class was one of the Regia Marina's first classes of submarines to be built after the First World War. They displaced 823 metric tons (810 long tons) surfaced and 1,009 metric tons (993 long tons) submerged. The submarines were 64.6 meters (211 ft 11 in) long, had a beam of 6.51 meters (21 ft 4 in) and a draft of 4.3 meters (14 ft 1 in). They had an operational diving depth of 90 meters (300 ft). Their crew numbered 49 officers and enlisted men.

For surface running, the boats were powered by two 1,550-brake-horsepower (1,156 kW) diesel engines, each driving one propeller shaft. When submerged each propeller was driven by a 550-horsepower (410 kW) electric motor. They could reach 15 knots (28 km/h; 17 mph) on the surface and 7.2 knots (13.3 km/h; 8.3 mph) underwater. On the surface, the Mameli class had a range of 4,360 nautical miles (8,070 km; 5,020 mi) at 8 knots (15 km/h; 9.2 mph); submerged, they had a range of 110 nmi (200 km; 130 mi) at 3 knots (5.6 km/h; 3.5 mph).

The boats were armed with six 53.3-centimeter (21 in) torpedo tubes, four in the bow and two in the stern for which they carried a total of 10 torpedoes. They were also armed with a single 102-millimeter (4 in) deck gun forward of the conning tower for combat on the surface. Their anti-aircraft armament consisted of two single 13.2-millimeter (0.52 in) machine guns.

== Ships ==
Construction data
Ship	Builder	Laid down	Launched	Commissioned	Fate
Pier Capponi	Cantieri navali Tosi di Taranto, Taranto	27 August 1925	19 June 1927	19 January 1929	Sunk by HMS Rorqual 31 March 1941
Giovanni da Procida	Cantieri navali Tosi di Taranto, Taranto	21 September 1925	1 April 1928	20 January 1929	Stricken 1 February 1948
Goffredo Mameli	Cantieri navali Tosi di Taranto, Taranto	17 August 1925	9 December 1926	20 January 1929	Stricken 1 February 1948
Tito Speri	Cantieri navali Tosi di Taranto, Taranto	28 September 1925	25 May 1928	20 August 1929	Stricken 1 February 1948

== Service history ==
Giovanni Da Procida is the only submarine of this class known to have attempted to sink a ship during the Spanish Civil War, albeit unsuccessfully. The Mamelis participated in the Second World War. Three boats survived the war to be discarded in 1948.
