= Pisani-class submarine =

Italian submarine class

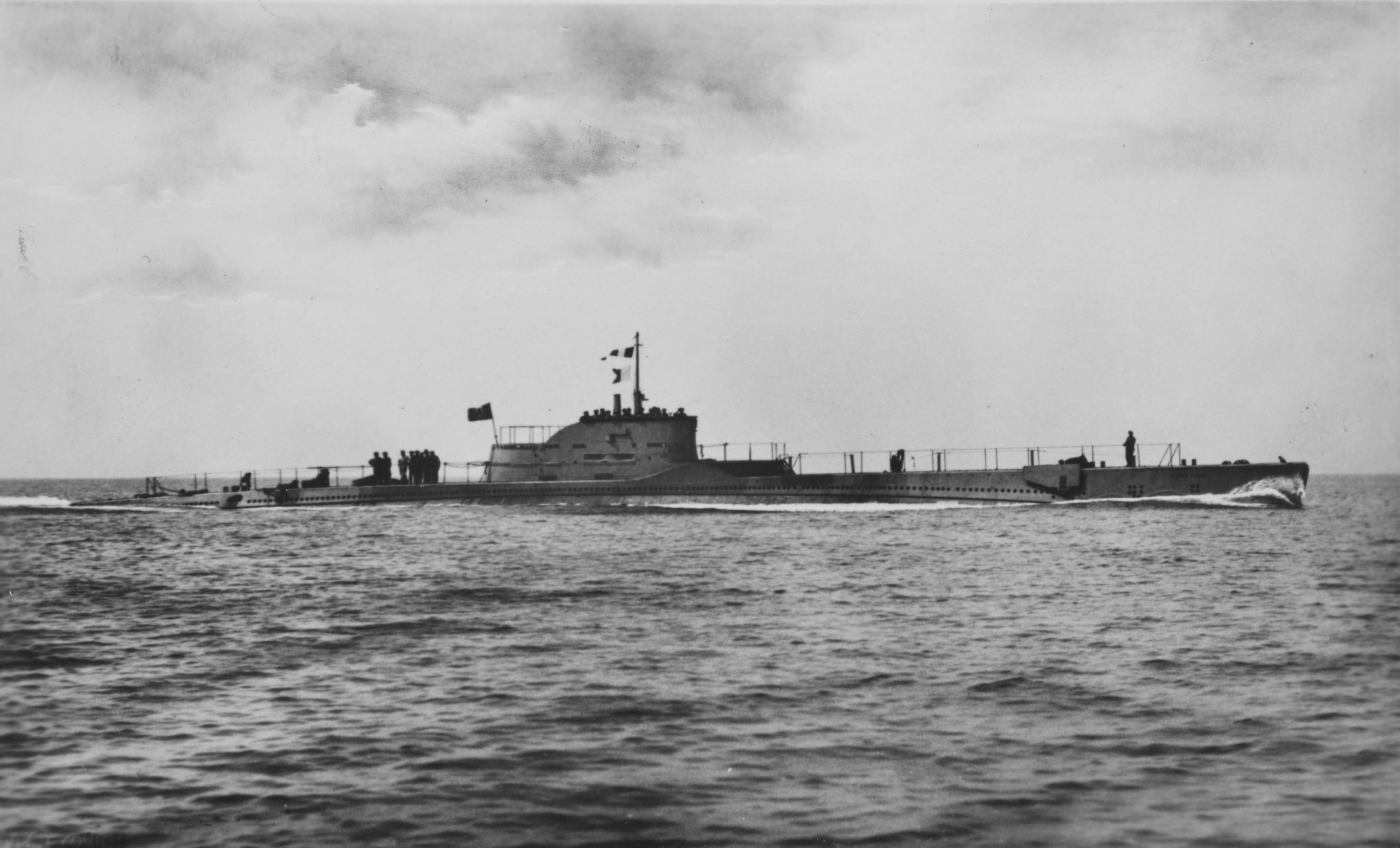
- Vettore Pisani on the surface

Class overview
- Operators: Regia Marina
- Preceded by: Mameli class
- Succeeded by: Bandiera class
- In commission: 1928–1947
- Completed: 4
- Scrapped: 4

General characteristics
- Type: Submarine
- Displacement: 880 t (866 long tons) (surfaced); 1,057 t (1,040 long tons) (submerged)
- Length: 68.2 m (223 ft 9 in)
- Beam: 6.09 m (20 ft)
- Draft: 4.93 m (16 ft 2 in)
- Installed power: 3,000 bhp (2,200 kW) (diesels); 1,100 hp (820 kW) (electric motors)
- Propulsion: 2 shafts; diesel-electric; 2 × diesel engines; 2 × electric motors
- Speed: 15 knots (28 km/h; 17 mph) (surfaced); 8.2 knots (15.2 km/h; 9.4 mph) (submerged)
- Range: 5,000 nmi (9,300 km; 5,800 mi) at 8 knots (15 km/h; 9.2 mph) (surfaced); 70 nmi (130 km; 81 mi) at 4 knots (7.4 km/h; 4.6 mph) (submerged)
- Test depth: 90 m (300 ft)
- Crew: 48
- Armament: 1 × single 102 mm (4 in) deck gun; 2 × single 13.2 mm (0.52 in) machine guns; 6 × 533 mm (21 in) torpedo tubes (4 bow, 2 stern)

The Pisani-class submarines were built for the Regia Marina (Royal Italian Navy) during the late 1920s. They played a minor role in the Spanish Civil War of 1936–1939 supporting the Spanish Nationalists.

== Design and description ==
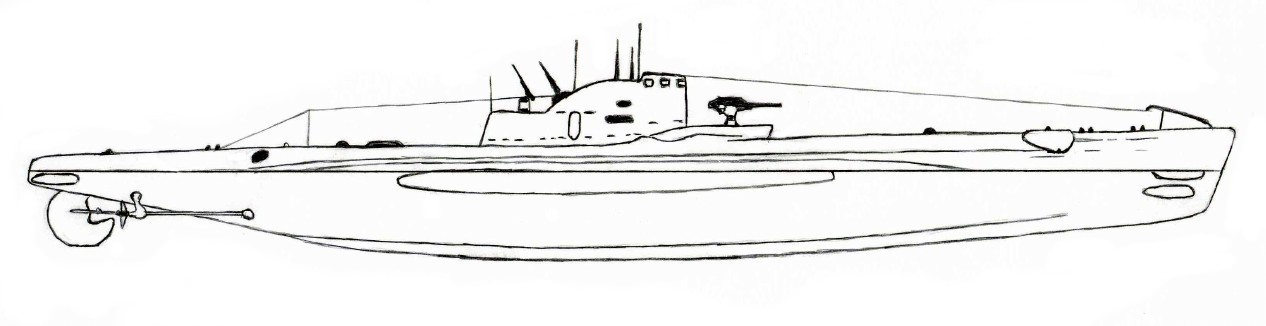
Right-profile line drawing of the Pisani class

Designed in parallel with the Mameli-class submarines, the Pisani class was larger to accommodate more fuel and give them more range. They displaced 880 metric tons (866 long tons) surfaced and 1,057 metric tons (1,040 long tons) submerged. The submarines were 68.2 meters (223 ft 9 in) long, had a beam of 6.09 meters (20 ft) and a draft of 4.93 meters (16 ft 2 in). They had an operational diving depth of 90 meters (300 ft). Their crew numbered 48 officers and enlisted men.

For surface running, the boats were powered by two 1,500-brake-horsepower (1,119 kW) diesel engines, each driving one propeller shaft. When submerged each propeller was driven by a 550-horsepower (410 kW) electric motor. Like the Mamelis, their stability was poor and they had to be modified with bulges after completion. This reduced their speeds from 17.25 knots (31.95 km/h; 19.85 mph) on the surface and 8.75 knots (16.21 km/h; 10.07 mph) underwater to 15 knots (28 km/h; 17 mph) and 8.2 knots (15.2 km/h; 9.4 mph) respectively. On the surface, the Pisani class had a range of 5,000 nautical miles (9,300 km; 5,800 mi) at 8 knots (15 km/h; 9.2 mph); submerged, they had a range of 70 nmi (130 km; 81 mi) at 4 knots (7.4 km/h; 4.6 mph).

The boats were armed with six 53.3-centimeter (21 in) torpedo tubes, four in the bow and two in the stern for which they carried a total of nine torpedoes. They were also armed with a single 102-millimeter (4 in) deck gun forward of the conning tower for combat on the surface. Their anti-aircraft armament consisted of two 13.2-millimeter (0.52 in) machine guns.

== Boats ==
Construction data
Ship	Builder	Laid down	Launched	Completed	Fate
Giovanni Bausan	Cantiere Navale Triestino, Trieste	27 January 1926	24 March 1927	15 September 1929	Decommissioned 16 April 1942, converted into an oil barge
Marcantonio Colonna	Cantiere Navale Triestino, Trieste	3 December 1925	26 December 1927	10 July 1929	Scrapped, 1943
Des Geneys	Cantiere Navale Triestino, Trieste	1 February 1926	14 November 1928	31 October 1929	Decommissioned 16 April 1942, converted into a battery-charging hulk
Vettor Pisani	Cantiere Navale Triestino, Trieste	18 November 1925	24 November 1927	16 June 1929	Decommissioned, 23 March 1947

== Service history ==
During the Spanish Civil War, Vettore Pisani made at least one patrol off the Catalan coast in August 1937 during which she made one unsuccessful attack.
