= Cannon 102/35 Model 1914 =

Cannone da 102/35 S. 1914
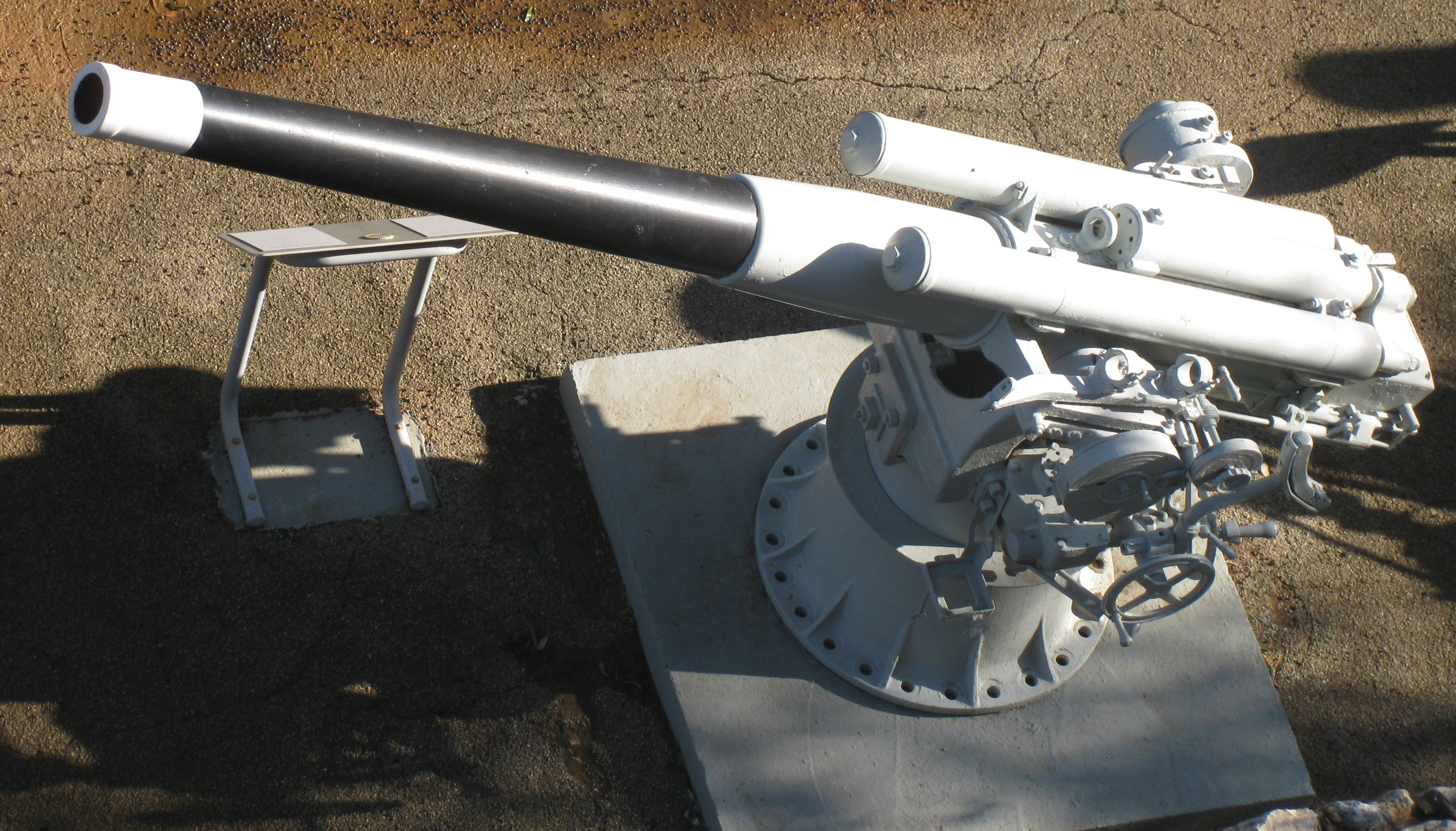
- Cannone da 102/35 S. 1914-15
- Type: Naval gun Anti-aircraft gun Coastal artillery Truck mounted artillery Railway gun
- Place of origin: France

Service history
- In service: 1915–1960
- Used by: Italy; Romania
- Wars: World War I World War II

Production history
- Designer: Schneider
- Designed: 1914
- Manufacturer: Ansaldo; Vickers-Terni
- Produced: 1914–1933

Specifications
- Mass: 1,207 kg (2,661 lb)
- Barrel length: 3.733 m (12 ft 3.0 in) 35 Caliber
- Shell: 102 x 651,5mm R
- Shell weight: 13.7–15 kg (30–33 lb)
- Caliber: 102 mm (4.0 in)
- Breech: Rotating vertical breech block
- Elevation: Naval: -5° to +35° Dual-purpose: -5° to +80°
- Traverse: -360°
- Rate of fire: 7 rpm
- Muzzle velocity: 755 m/s (2,480 ft/s)
- Effective firing range: 9.4 km (31,000 ft) AA ceiling
- Maximum firing range: 11.7 km (7.3 mi) at +45°

The Cannone da 102/35 S. 1914 was a naval gun of the Royal Italian Navy in World War I and World War II, which was modified for shore based anti-aircraft, truck-mounted artillery, railway gun and coastal artillery roles.

== History ==
The Cannone da 102/35 S. 1914 was a licensed produced Schneider gun built in Italy by Ansaldo since 1914. The gun was produced in two different models (S. 1914 and S. 1914-15), manufactured by Ansaldo or Vickers-Terni (then O.T.O.) and was mounted on seven different types of mount.

The difference between the original S. 1914 model and the later S. 1914-15 was in the position of the breech block operating system and the related semi-automatic mechanism: in the S. 1914 they were on the left side, in the S. 1914-15 they were on the right side.

All the guns were characterized by the peculiar Schneider type vertical rotating breech block.

The mounts used were:

- S. 1914 su affusto mod.1914 - Single pedestal mount, elevation: +20°/-5°
- S. 1914-15 su affusto mod. 1915 - single pedestal mount, elevation: +20°/-5°
- S. 1914-15 su affusto mod. 1915 modificato - single pedestal mount, elevation: +35°/-5°
- S. 1914-15 su affusto S.A.V. mod. 1915 - single anti-aircraft platform mount, elevation: +80°/-5°
- S. 1914-15 su affusto Ansaldo mod. 1925 - single anti-aircraft platform mount, elevation: +85°/-5°
- S. 1914-15 su affusto V.T. mod. 1925 - single anti-aircraft platform mount, elevation: +90°/-7°
- S. 1914-15 su affusto O.T.O. mod. 1933 - single anti-aircraft platform mount, elevation: +80°/-5°

=== Naval use ===
The 102/35 armed many classes of destroyers and minelayers of the Royal Italian Navy produced during and immediately after World War I, as well as some classes of submarine. As early as World War I the Cannon 102/35 was in the process of being replaced by the 102/45 or the later 120/45. However the 102/35 stayed on in a number of different roles in navy and army service until World War II.

Ship classes that carried the 102/35 include:

- Allesandro Poerio-class
- Andrea Bafile-class
- Argonauta-class
- Azio class
- Bandiera-class
- Bragadin-class
- Giuseppe Sirtori-class
- Indomito-class
- Mameli-class
- Mirabello-class
- Rosolino Pilo-class
- Settembrini-class
- Squalo-class
- Pisani-class

=== World War I – land use ===
Before Italy’s entry into World War I in 1915, Ansaldo offered to provide the Royal Italian Army with forty seven 102/35 guns originally earmarked for installation on destroyers. These were fitted with large shields and mounted on SPA 9000 truck chassis and were known as 102/35 on SPA 9000. The Army urgently needed heavy field guns and, since the production of the 105/28 gun was not enough to meet the demand the proposal of a mobile version of the 102/35 as an emergency replacement was accepted. The total number of guns produced was 99–105 and these armed sixteen mobile batteries during World War I. These proved effective in operations against Austro-Hungarian forces, however in 1919 the guns were removed from the trucks and are believed to have been returned to the navy.

=== World War II – land use ===
When Italy entered World War II in 1940 it was estimated that one hundred ten 102/35 guns were still in service on land. Six were mounted on a navy armored train, which had two carriages each armed with three guns. While others were mounted on anti-aircraft mounts or used as coastal artillery. In 1941 the Fiat plant in Tripoli mounted seven on trucks and were referred to as 102/35 su Fiat 634N. The guns came from defenses around Tripoli and these established the 1st and 6th mobile batteries, manned by men of the Maritime Militia Artillery. The 102/35 guns were used as anti-aircraft guns, anti-tank guns and as field-artillery. The 1st mobile battery was assigned to the 132nd Armoured Division Ariete, while the 6th mobile battery was assigned to the 102nd Motorised Division Trento.

A few guns were also used by Romania, forming an anti-aircraft battery near the port of Constanța. The battery took part in the Raid on Constanța, the main naval battle in the Black Sea during the War, managing to shoot down six Soviet aircraft.

== Photo gallery ==
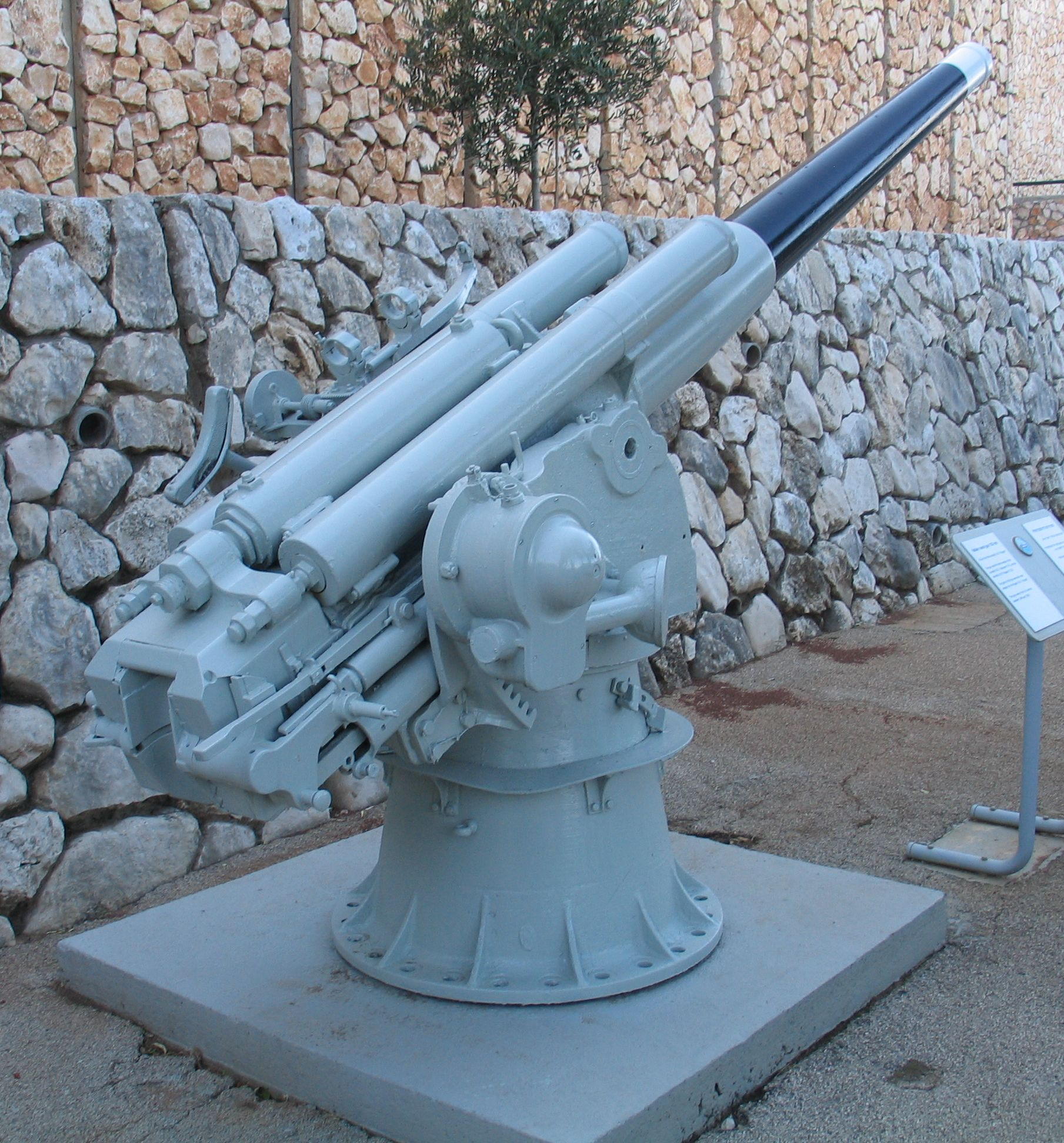
Cannone da 102/35 S. 1914-15 on central pivot mount

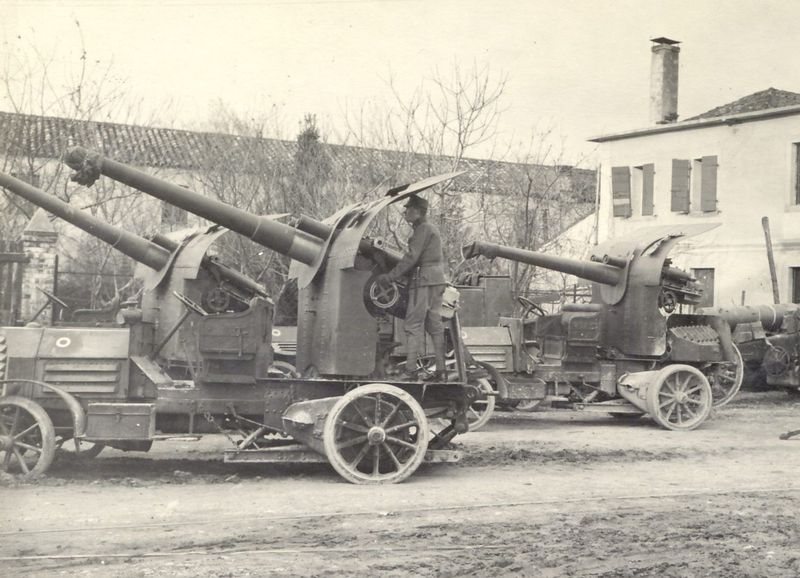
102/35 on SPA9000 captured by the Austrians in WWI

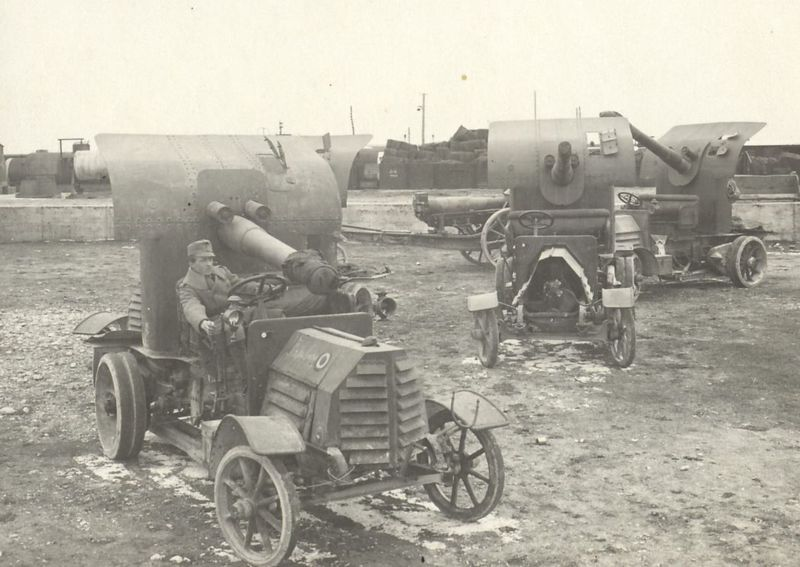
102/35 on SPA9000 captured by the Austrians in WWI

== Bibliography ==
- Ministero della Marina (1917). Cannoni ed affusti da 102/35 S. 1914-15. Roma.
- Ministero della Marina (1927). tavola: Cannone da 102/35 S. 1914 su affusto normale, a culla ed a piedistallo, mod. 1914 - tavola: Cannone da 102/35 S. 1914-15 su affusto normale, a culla ed a piedistallo, mod. 1915, a 20° di elevazione - tavola: Cannone da 102/35 S. 1914-15 su affusto normale, a culla ed a piedistallo, mod. 1915, a 35° di elevazione - tavola: Cannone da 102/35 S. 1914-15 su affusto antiaereo, a culla ed a piattaforma, mod. 1915 - tavola: Cannone da 102/35 S. 1914-15 su affusto antiaereo, a culla ed a piattaforma, mod. 1925 An. - tavola: Cannone da 102/35 S. 1914-15 su affusto antiaereo, a culla ed a piattaforma, mod. 1925 V.T. Roma.
- Ministero della Marina (1946). tavola: Cannone da 102/35 S. 1914-15 su affusto a.a. singolo a culla ed a piattaforma mod. 1933 O.T.O. Roma.
- Cappellano, Filippo (1998). Le artiglierie del Regio Esercito nella Seconda Guerra Mondiale. Parma.
- Cappellano, Filippo (2014). Batterie Volanti - Autocannoni e artiglierie portate italiane (1915-1943). Parma.
- Campbell, John (1985). Naval Weapons of World War Two. Naval Institute Press. ISBN 0-87021-459-4.
- Friedman, Norman (2011). Naval Weapons of World War One. Barnsley, South Yorkshire, UK: Seaforth. ISBN 978-1-84832-100-7.
- Riccio, Ralph; Pignato, Nicola (2010). Italian Truck Mounted Artillery: In Action. In Action Series. Squadron/Signal Publications. ISBN 978-0-89747-601-0.
- http://www.navweaps.com/Weapons/WNIT_4-35_m1914.php
