= Rupert Lonsdale =

Royal Navy submarine commander (1905–1999)

- Born: 5 May 1905
- Died: 25 April 1999 (aged 93)
- Military career
- Allegiance: United Kingdom
- Branch: Royal Navy
- Service years: 1927-1946 Honourable discharge
- Rank: Commander
- Commands: HMS Seal
- Conflicts: World War II Prisoner of War
- Awards: Mentioned in despatches
- Other work: Anglican vicar

Rupert Philip Lonsdale (5 May 1905 – 25 April 1999) was a British submarine commander, prisoner of war and Anglican clergyman. He was forced to surrender his boat in World War II after he had succeeded in rescuing her and her crew from the sea bed after she struck a mine. He then spent five years as a prisoner of war. In 1946, he was court-martialed for the loss of the submarine and was honourably acquitted.

After the war Lonsdale took Anglican holy orders, serving in several parishes. In 1952, he volunteered to go as a District Chaplain to Kenya, to help find a peaceful solution to the Mau Mau Uprising.

== Early life ==
Lonsdale was born in Dublin and educated at St. Cyprian's School, Eastbourne and the Royal Naval College, Osborne. He began in the submarine branch of the service in 1927 and within four years was first lieutenant of XI, a large experimental submersible. With four 5.2-inch guns and displacing 2,780 tons this was one of the largest submersibles of the era.

In 1934 he passed the demanding submarine command qualifying course, and his first command was H44, a legacy of World War I, of 440 tons, with four torpedo tubes and a machine-gun. Lonsdale was promoted lieutenant-commander in May 1936 and in 1937 he took over the newer Swordfish for a year.

== HMS Seal ==
Lonsdale's next command on 1 November 1938 was Seal, a Grampus-class submarine, which he commissioned in May 1939. It undertook a mission in the China Sea. When World War II broke out it was held up at Aden. It returned to the North Atlantic and the North Sea Patrol.

The submarine was then given the task of crossing the Skagerrak and laying a minefield in the Kattegat. This operation, named FD7, was part of the Norwegian campaign of early 1940. Lonsdale's superior, Captain Jocelyn Slingsby "Jock" Bethell, commanding 6th Submarine Flotilla, considered the operation too dangerous for a large mine-laying submarine. But he failed to persuade Admiral Max Horton to reconsider his orders, and Seal sailed from Immingham on 29 April 1940.

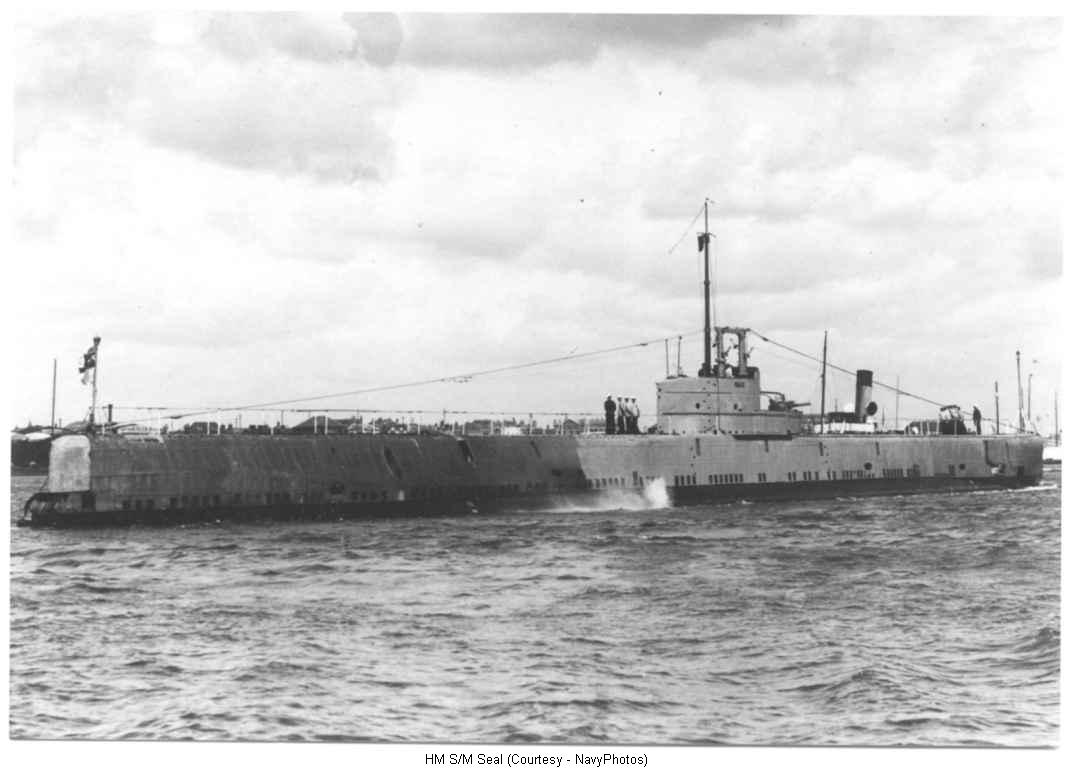
British Grampus class submarine HMS Seal, captured by Germany in 1940 and renamed U-B.

In the small hours of the morning of 4 May, Seal entered the Kattegat on the surface, where it was spotted by a Heinkel He 115 and bombed. After repairs, it continued south-east, encountering German anti-submarine trawlers between Læsø and Gothenburg. Stymied in a calm sea, Lonsdale mined an area by Vinga.

Turning back on a bearing for Skagen, Seal observed E-boats. As it took evasive action, it hit a newly-laid "Skagen barrier" minefield. While it dived to escape the area the boat went into an uncharted minefield. A diving plane snagged a mine's anchor line. At 1855, a mine explosion caused serious stern damage to the submarine.

The attempt to resurface had to wait some hours until it was dark. In three attempts, the damaged submarine failed to lift from the seabed and air quality deteriorated significantly. Lonsdale summoned his ship's company and led them in the Lord's Prayer. After taking some last desperate measures, he made another attempt and the submarine finally lifted.

Once on the surface, Lonsdale tried to make for the nearby Swedish coast and the crew destroyed the secret Asdic equipment and confidential papers. The submarine was spotted and attacked by enemy aircraft. Lonsdale sent his crew below, and under fire tried to hold the aircraft off with Lewis guns until these jammed. There was no realistic alternative but to surrender: actions were taken to scuttle it, but Seal stayed afloat.

== Prisoner of war ==
Early on 5 May 1940, Lonsdale swam to a seaplane and gave himself up. Later it was known that Horton had sent two signals in response to his surfacing signal relaying his intention to make for Sweden: "Understood and agreed with. Best of luck. Well done", followed by "Safety of personnel should be your first consideration after destruction of Asdics". These were not received because the ciphers had been destroyed. He was mentioned in despatches four days later for his previous patrol work.

During his five years of imprisonment, Lonsdale found comfort in his Christian faith. He maintained contact with the village of Seal who had adopted the crew. Once he wrote "Within the last few days I have had a talk with each one of my crew who are in this camp. Despite a hard winter, enforced idleness, and the unnatural life led by any prisoner they all look fit; I cannot emphasis this too much; they really do look well, which is great credit to them and I would be grateful if you could let their next of kin know as you kindly did before." He worked to maintain morale and used his limited ration of mail on behalf of his crew members.

After the war, Lonsdale was mentioned in despatches in June 1945 for his services as a prisoner of war, promoted to commander and placed on the retired list at his own request. His last command was the new Algerine-class minesweeper Pyrrhus, which he brought up from Glanton before joining an operational flotilla at Portsmouth in January 1946. Lonsdale was tried by court martial at Portsmouth, on 10 April 1946, for the loss of Seal. He was acquitted with an honourable discharge.

== Kenya ==
Lonsdale went to Ridley Hall in Cambridge in 1946 to prepare for his ordination and became a priest in 1949. His first curacy was with a mission church at Rowner, near HMS Dolphin, the submarine base at Gosport, followed by becoming vicar of Morden-with-Almer in Dorset in 1951. In 1953 he started a five-year tour in the White Highlands of Kenya as a district chaplain. He volunteered for this mission because he thought that his five years as a prisoner of war should help him to befriend the rebels of the Mau Mau Rebellion, and at one point he offered to live in the bush as a hostage, to demonstrate Britain's benevolent intentions.

== England ==
In 1958 he returned to England to be vicar of Bentworth-with-Shaldon in Hampshire but then in 1960 returned out of affection to Kenya for another tour of duty. He became a canon emeritus, and his last full-time incumbency was from 1965 to 1970 as vicar of Thornham-with-Titchwell on the north Norfolk coast. Lonsdale retired to Hampshire, but held several part-time chaplaincies for the Anglican Church's European diocese based on Gibraltar. This led to a three-year stay in Tenerife (1970–73) before he returned to England for some time in the clergy hospice at College of St Mark at Audley End. Lonsdale died at Bournemouth, Dorset.

== Personal life ==
Lonsdale was married four times, and had one son.

1. His first wife Christina Lyall, whom he married in 1935, died in 1937 in childbirth.
2. In 1953 he married Kathleen Deal, whom he took out to Kenya; she died in 1961.
3. In 1963 he married Ursula Sansum, a former Women's Royal Naval Service officer, who also supported him in Kenya; she died in 1986.
4. He married Ethne Irwin in Malta in 1989. She survived him.

He was survived also by his son John Lonsdale, Fellow of Trinity College, Cambridge, a historian of East Africa.

In 1960, C. E. T. Warren and James Benson asked Rupert Lonsdale for his help with their book about the loss of Seal, Will Not We Fear: The Story of His Majesty's Submarine "Seal" and of Lieutenant-Commander Rupert Lonsdale (1961). He agreed, provided that he could write a foreword making it clear that he was a reluctant contributor, who trusted that it might help some readers to find faith in God. The book includes a tribute from him to his ship's company and the authors prefaced his foreword with the first seven verses of Psalm XLVI from which they drew their title. Sainsbury wrote that "his quiet and considerate approach to command succeeded to an unusually high degree."
