= 14th Searchlight Battery =

14th Searchlight Battery may refer to:

- 14th Searchlight Battery (Finland), during the Continuation War
- 14th Searchlight Battery, Royal Artillery, British Army, during World War II
