= German night fighter direction vessel Togo =

German merchant ship converted to an armed cruiser

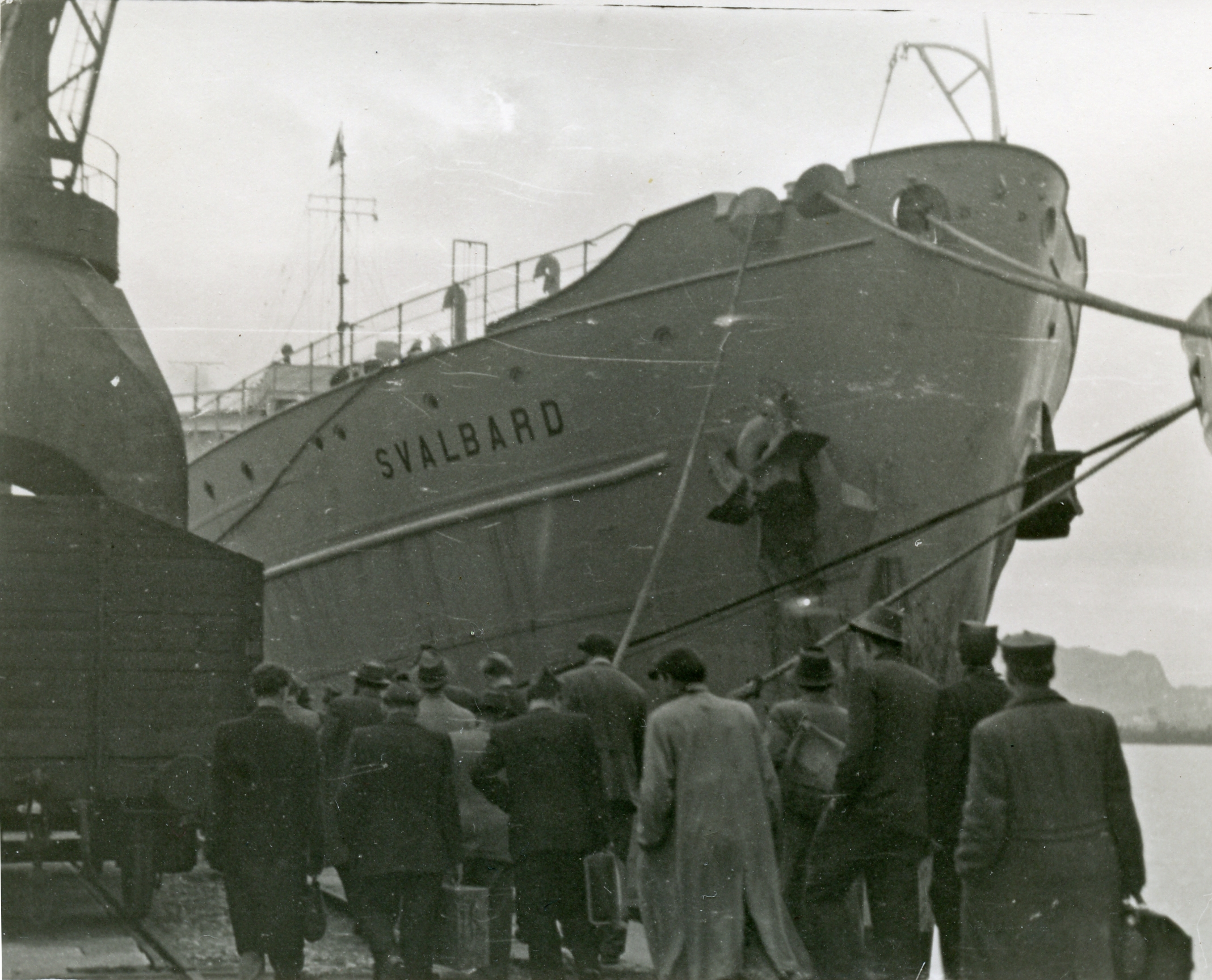
- Displaced Persons about to board HNoMS Svalbard (ex-Togo) in Genoa, Italy, in December 1948 for resettlement in Australia

History

Germany
- Name: Togo
- Namesake: Togo
- Operator: Woermann-Linie
- Builder: Bremer Vulkan, Vegesack
- Launched: 13 August 1938
- Home port: Hamburg
- Identification: call sign DJXJ
- Fate: Requisitioned by Kriegsmarine, 1939

Nazi Germany
- Name: Schiff 14
- Namesake: Battle of Coronel
- Operator: Kriegsmarine
- Builder: Wilton, Rotterdam
- Yard number: 10
- Acquired: Requisitioned, 1939
- Recommissioned: December 1942
- Renamed: (HSK Coronel, 1942)
- Reclassified: Minelayer, 1940; Auxiliary cruiser, 1942; Minesweeper, 1943
- Home port: Kiel
- Nickname(s): HSK-10; Raider K
- Fate: Transferred to the Luftwaffe, 1943

Nazi Germany
- Name: Togo
- Operator: Luftwaffe
- Acquired: 1943
- Recommissioned: 1943
- Reclassified: Night fighter guide ship, 1943
- Home port: Kiel
- Fate: War booty, 1945; transferred from UK to USA, then to Norway
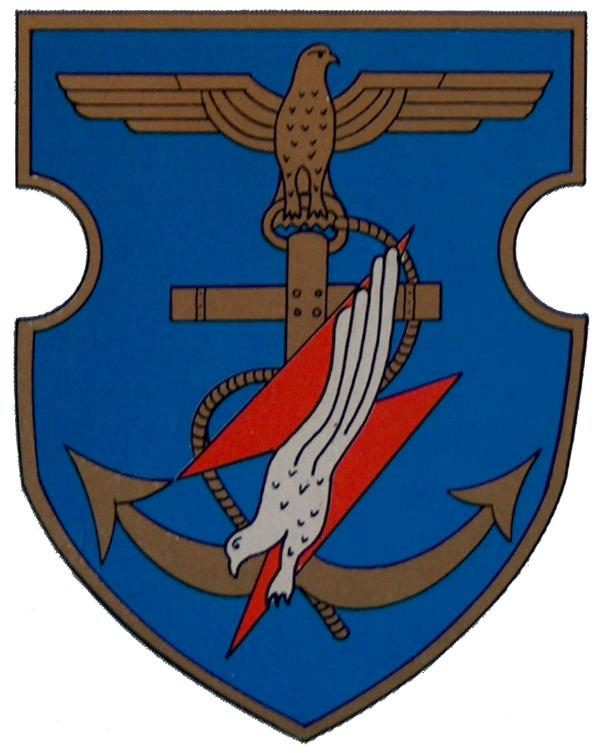
- Badge: Badge of NJL Togo

Norway
- Name: Svalbard, then Tilthorn and Stella Marina
- Acquired: 14 March 1946
- Fate: Sold

West Germany
- Name: Togo
- Operator: Deutsch Afrikanische Schiffahrts GmbH, Hamburg
- Acquired: November 1956
- Fate: Sold

Panama
- Name: Lacasielle, then Topeka
- Acquired: March 1968
- Identification: IMO number: 5363029
- Fate: Ran aground on 21 November 1984; Coatzacoalcos, Mexico; 18°10′12″N 94°18′36″W

General characteristics As NJL Togo
- Type: Night fighter guide ship
- Displacement: 12,700 t (12,500 long tons)
- Length: 134 m (439 ft 8 in)
- Beam: 17.9 m (58 ft 9 in)
- Draft: 7.9 m (25 ft 11 in)
- Installed power: 5,100 hp (3,800 kW)
- Propulsion: 2 × 8-cylinder diesel engines; 1 × shaft
- Speed: 16 kn (30 km/h; 18 mph)
- Endurance: 36,000 nmi (67,000 km; 41,000 mi) at 10 kn (19 km/h; 12 mph)
- Complement: 283 crew plus 74 radar specialists from the Luftwaffe
- Sensors & processing systems: FuMG A1 Freya radar early warning radar; Würzburg-Riese gun-laying radar
- Armament: 3 10.5 cm anti-aircraft guns; 8 3.7 cm anti-aircraft guns (4×2); 22 20 mm anti-aircraft cannons (5×4, 2×1)

MS Togo was a German merchant ship that was launched in 1938. Requisitioned by Nazi Germany's Kriegsmarine as Schiff 14, in April 1940 she participated in the invasion of Norway; in August 1940 was converted to a minelayer as part of the German plan to invade England; then from June 1941 she began conversion to the armed auxiliary cruiser (Hilfskreuzer) HSK Coronel.

Following Coronel's unsuccessful attempt in February 1943 to become the last German commerce raider of World War II, she was then used as a minesweeper (Sperrbrecher) before being recommissioned in late 1943 as NJL Togo, a night fighter direction vessel (Nachtjagdleitschiff), operating in the Baltic Sea.

As NJL Togo, she was the second of the Kriegsmarine's World War II radar ships, and the only one to survive the war.

After the war, Togo passed through various changes of ownership, name and function before finally being wrecked off the Mexican coast in 1984.

== Description and pre-war service ==
As built, Togo was 418.2 feet (127.47 m), long, with a beam of 58.7 feet (17.89 m) and a depth of 21.3 feet (6.49 m). Her gross register tonnage was 5,042, with a net register tonnage of 2,844. She was powered by two 8-cylinder Single Cycle Double Action diesel engines, each having cylinders of 28 3/4 inches (73 cm) diameter by 43 5/16 inches (110.0 cm) stroke. The engines gave a total of 1,556 NHP.

Togo was owned by Hamburg-Bremen-Afrika Linie A.G. and was operated by Woermann-Linie A.G., operating as Deutsche Ost-Afrika Linie. The Code Letters DJXJ were allocated and her port of registry was Hamburg.

== History during World War II ==
MS Togo was launched in August 1938 for Woermann Linie for trade with African countries. Togo was initially built as a freighter with cabins for 12 passengers. At the outbreak of World War II Togo was at Douala, French Cameroon. To avoid Togo being captured and interned, her Belgian-born captain, Eugene Rousselet, slipped her out under cover of darkness to the Belgian Congo port of Boma. On 25 October, she sailed from Boma and, breaking through the Allied blockade, returned to Hamburg on 23 November 1939 where she was requisitioned by the Kriegsmarine.

=== As minelayer ===
In April 1940, Togo was a support ship (Werkstattschiff) for the German invasion of Norway and on 21 April 1940 sustained damage in a British minefield, laid by the submarine HMS Narwhal, in the Kattegat east of Cape Skagen.

She was rebuilt as a minelayer (Minenleger) and based in Cherbourg from August to November 1940 as part of Operation Sea Lion, the planned German invasion of England.

=== As commerce raider Coronel ===
In late 1942, Togo was converted into an auxiliary cruiser. As part of this conversion she was renamed (Handels-Stör-Kreuzer, HSK) Coronel, she was known to the Kriegsmarine as HSK 10, and designated Schiff 14. To the Royal Navy, she was Raider K. She was named after the Battle of Coronel, Admiral Maximilian von Spee's victory over a British cruiser flotilla off the coast of Chile in November 1914.

Converted at the Wilton-Fijenoord shipyards in Rotterdam and the Stettiner Oderwerke yard at Stettin, she was recommissioned in December 1942. Her armament consisted of six TK15 15 cm guns, six 4 cm AA-guns, four 2 cm machine guns in twin mounts, and a few 2 cm guns in single mounts.

She was also designed to carry three aircraft, but these were never installed.

She was commanded by Kapitän zur See Ernst-Ludwig Thienemann, and carried a crew of 16 officers and 331 men.

Relying on the element of surprise, Schiff 14 Coronel departed from Norway on 31 January 1943 with a large escort of minelayers and patrol boats and attempted to break out into the Atlantic through the English Channel. However, her presence was already known to the British through ULTRA decrypts. Coronel was hampered by storms and minefields, and twice ran aground on sandbanks. Coronel moved on by stages to Sylt, Dunkirk and Calais and on 10 February ran the gauntlet of the coastal artillery at Dover. She then came under repeated air attack, and having suffered bomb damage, was forced to put into Boulogne. As the damage was too severe to be repaired in an occupied French port, she was forced to return to Kiel, arriving there on 2 March 1943.

As it was the custom for German commerce raiders to be named by their captains after reaching the open sea, her failure to clear the Channel meant that she was not formally designated as the Hilfskreuzer Coronel but instead remained as Togo for the remainder of the war.

=== As night fighter direction vessel ===
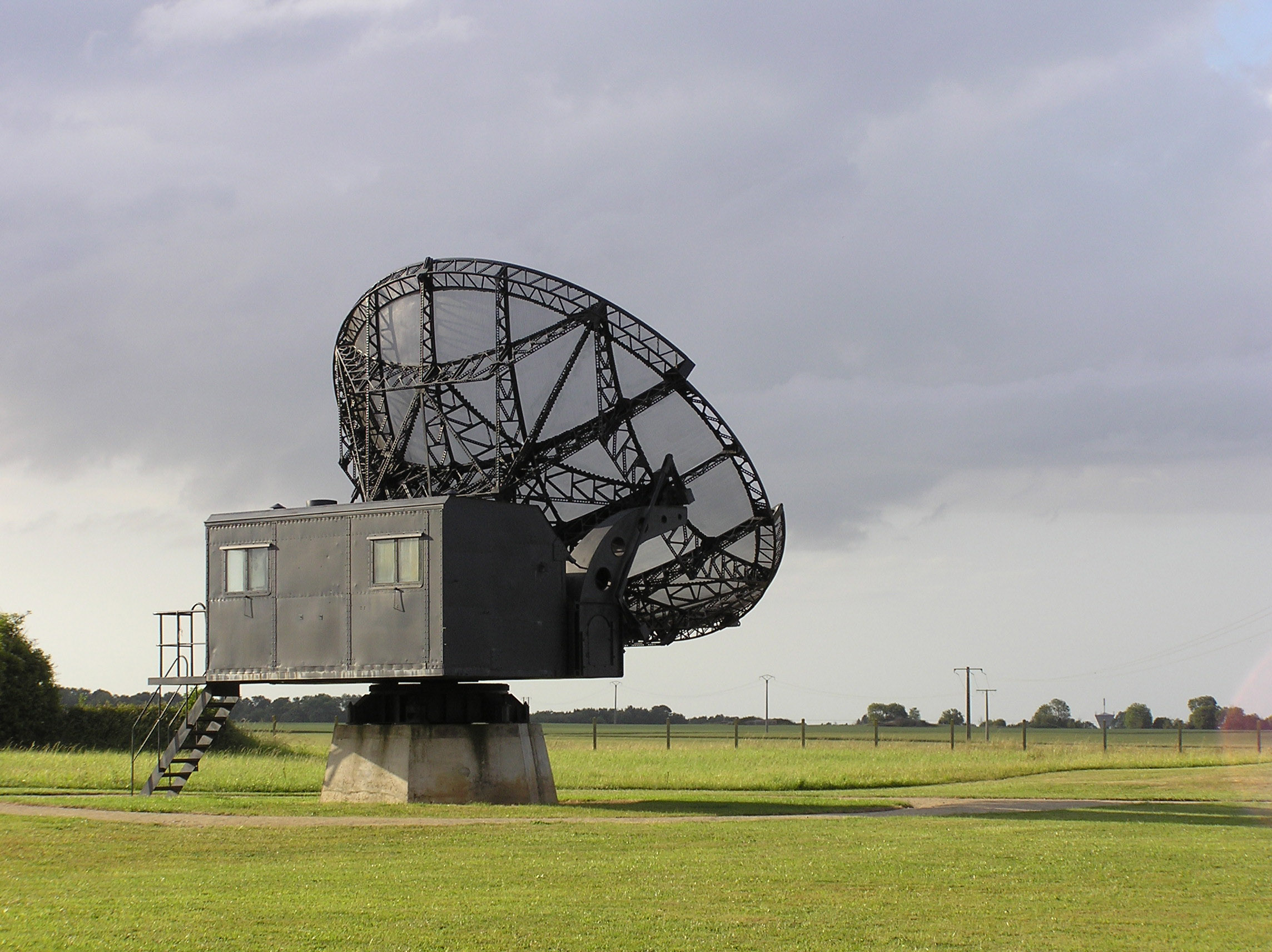
A Würzburg radar, similar to the one aboard Togo

Later the same year, Togo was employed in a minesweeping role as a Sperrbrecher ('Pathmaker', to clear a safe lane through a minefield), before being converted into a night fighter guide ship, under the command of Korvettenkapitän Rudolf Lück.

From October 1943, Togo cruised the Baltic Sea under the operational control of the Luftwaffe's 22/Luftnachrichten Regiment 222. In March 1944, after the three great Soviet bombing raids on Helsinki, she arrived in the Gulf of Finland to provide night fighter cover for Tallinn and Helsinki.

Near the end of the war, Togo took part in the evacuation of German troops and refugees from Westprussia, Pommerania, Danzig, East Prussia and Latvia.

== Postwar history ==
In Kiel at the end of the war, Togo was seized as war booty and transferred first to Britain on 13 August 1945, then to the US Navy on 15 January 1946, and used to repatriate Polish ex-prisoners of war. Handed over to the Royal Norwegian Navy on 14 March (and renamed HNoMS Svalbard in December 1946), she was then used as a fleet auxiliary to transport occupation troops to Germany. By this time her passenger capacity had been increased to 900, and between December 1947 and December 1949 she was chartered by the International Refugee Organization for transport of Displaced Persons from Europe to North America and Australia. Svalbard undertook six voyages between June 1948 and October 1949, carrying a total of 5,242 DPs for resettlement in Australia.

There were several further changes of ownership in 1954–56 which saw her briefly renamed as MS Tilthorn (April 1954) and later MS Stella Marina (July 1954), she was then re-purchased by her original owners, the Woermann-Deutsche Afrika line in November 1956. Refurbished and with her original name Togo restored, she sailed the Africa run for another twelve years. With the introduction of IMO Numbers in the late 1960s, Togo was allocated the IMO Number 5363029.

In March 1968, she was sold again, to Taboga Enterprises Inc. of Panama, and renamed Lacasielle. She was later sold again to Caribbean Real Estate SA, Panama, on 8 April 1976, becoming Topeka. It was under that name that she was last sold in 1984 to Lineas Agromar Ltda.

It was as the tramp steamer, MS Topeka that she finally ended her days, by running aground after being blown from her anchorage by strong winds 8 mi (7.0 nmi; 13 km) off Coatzacoalcos, Mexico (18°10′12″N 94°18′36″W) on 21 November 1984, with the death of two men out of her crew of 27.

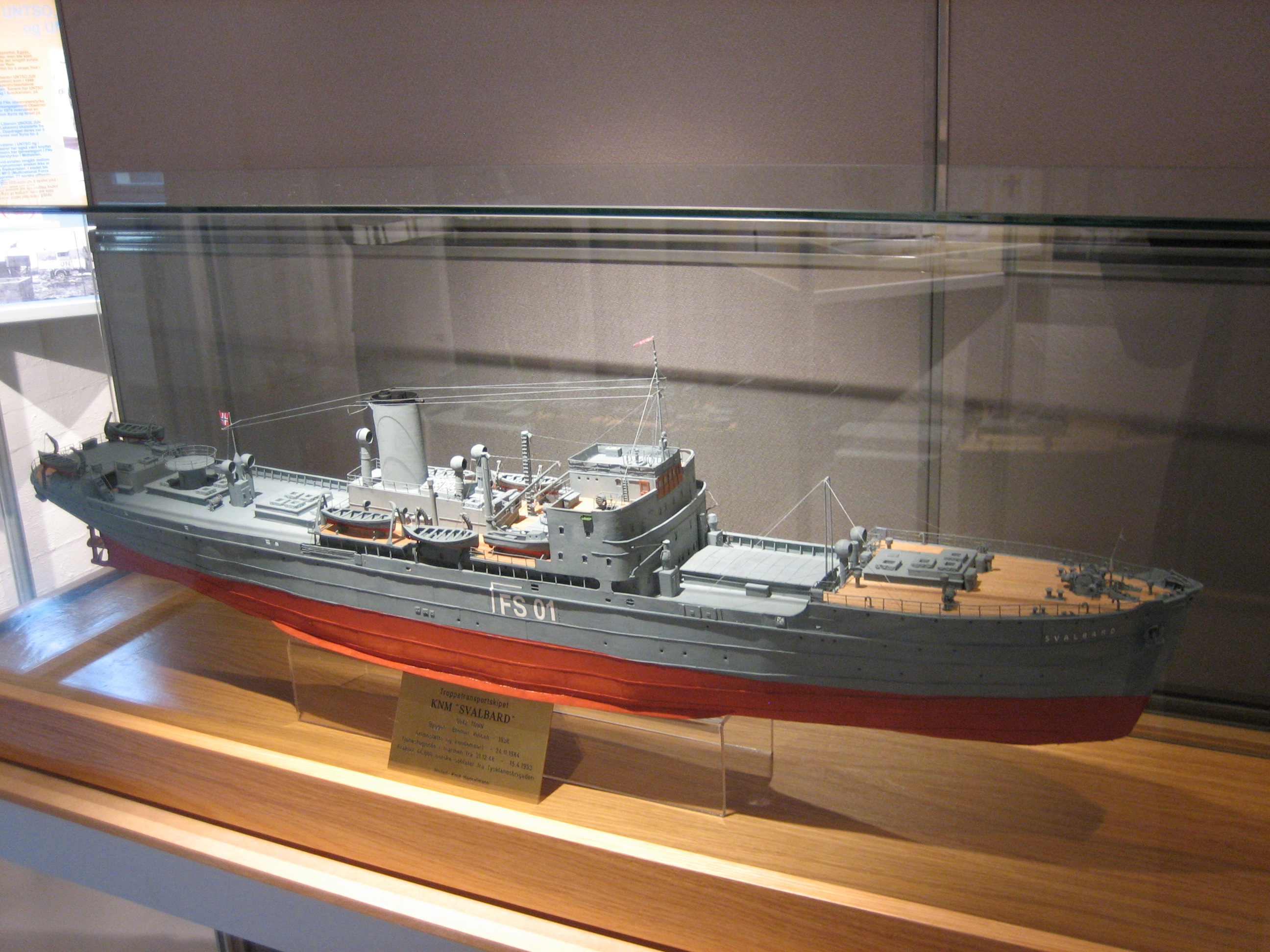
Model of the Norwegian troopship Svalbard (ex-Togo) at Bergenhus Fortress Museum

== Books ==
- Jung, Dieter (2002). "Question 17/00". Warship International. XXXIX (2): 142–144. ISSN 0043-0374.
- Muggenthaler, August Karl (1977): German Raiders of World War II ISBN 0-7091-6683-4
- Petsch, Kurt (1988): Nachtjagdleitschiff TOGO, Preuss. Militär-Verlag, Reutlingen. (In German, typeset in Fraktur.) Petsch was Togo's first officer during her career as a night fighter direction vessel.
- Roskill, Stephen (1956): The War at Sea 1939–1945 Vol II
- Schmalenbach, Paul (1977): German Raiders 1895–1945 ISBN 0-85059-351-4
