= HMS Porpoise (N14) =

Submarine of the Royal Navy

- HMS Porpoise

History

United Kingdom
- Name: HMS Porpoise
- Ordered: 11 June 1931
- Builder: Vickers-Armstrongs, Barrow
- Laid down: 22 September 1931
- Launched: 30 August 1932
- Commissioned: 11 March 1933
- Fate: Sunk 19 January 1945
- Badge

General characteristics
- Class & type: Grampus-class submarine
- Displacement: 1,768 tons surfaced; 2,035 tons submerged
- Length: 289 ft (88 m)
- Beam: 29 ft 10 in (9.09 m)
- Draught: 15 ft 10 in (4.83 m)
- Propulsion: 2 shaft, Diesel (3,300 hp (2,500 kW)) plus electric (1,630 hp (1,220 kW))
- Speed: 15.5 knots (28.7 km/h) surfaced; 8.75 knots (16.21 km/h) submerged
- Complement: 59
- Armament: 6 × 21 inch (533 mm) torpedo tubes (bow); 12 torpedoes; 1 × 4 in (102 mm) deck gun; 50 mines

HMS Porpoise (N14) was one of the six-ship class of Grampus-class mine-laying submarines of the Royal Navy. She was built at Vickers-Armstrongs, Barrow and launched 30 August 1932. She served in World War II in most of the naval theatres of the war, in home waters, the Mediterranean and the Far East. She was sunk with all hands by Japanese aircraft on 19 January 1945, and was the last Royal Navy submarine to be lost to enemy action.

== Career ==
In 1940, she was operating in the North Sea. She unsuccessfully attacked the German submarine U-3, and later sank the German minesweeper M 5 when she hit a mine laid by Porpoise. She reported firing on an unknown submarine, which may have been U-1 which disappeared about this time. However U-1 may have hit a mine laid by Porpoise's sister, HMS Narwhal.

Throughout late 1941 and 1942, Porpoise operated in the Mediterranean. On 9 December a few miles south of the Peloponnese she torpedoed and badly damaged the German passenger and cargo ship Sebastiano Veniero (Jansen), which was carrying about 2,000 UK, South African and other Commonwealth prisoners of war. At least 300 PoWs were killed, and the Germans beached the merchant ship at Methoni in Greece to prevent her sinking and further loss of life. Porpoise then returned to minelaying off Crete.

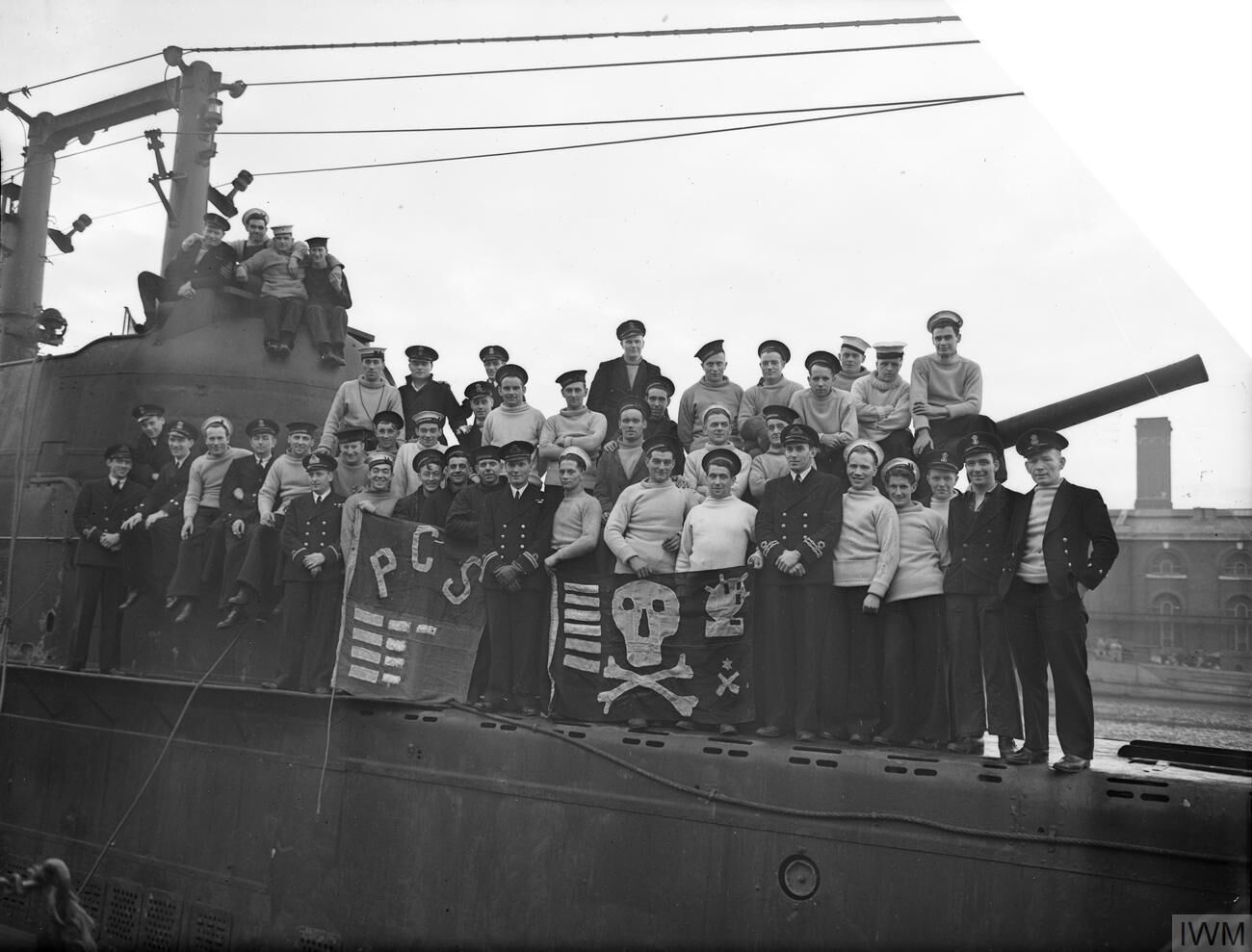
HMS Porpoise at Malta on 20 January 1943 (IWM A14004)

In 1942, under the command of Leslie Bennington, she sank the Italian merchant Citta di Livorno and later the Italian transport Ogaden, but missed the escorting Italian torpedo boat Montanari. Porpoise went on to torpedo and sink the Italian merchant Lerici, and unsuccessfully attacked the merchant Iseo on 19 August, an action during which she was damaged by depth charges from the escorting torpedo boat Lince. Towards the end of the year she sank the Italian tanker Giulio Giordani and the auxiliary patrol vessel F-39 / Fertilia, several days after an earlier attack on the ship had failed. The Italian torpedo boat Generale Antonio Cantore struck a mine laid by Porpoise and was also sunk.

1944 found Porpoise operating in the Pacific against Japanese forces. She directly sank several small sailing vessels, whilst the Japanese auxiliary submarine chasers Cha 8 and Cha 9, the army tanker Takekun Maru and the auxiliary minelayer Ma 1 were sunk after hitting mines laid by Porpoise. The auxiliary minesweeper Kyo Maru No. 1 and the submarine chaser Ch 57 were damaged by mines.

On 11 September 1944, Porpoise took part in Operation Rimau by ferrying 24 Australian commandoes to the island of Merapas, a small island off the coast of Singapore.

Porpoise returned to Fremantle, Australia on 24 October. On its return from Operation Rimau, Porpoise is noted to have encountered a small enemy convoy and later a large tanker. Porpoise declined an engagement at either opportunity as her orders were to remain hidden unless an important target presented itself. Porpoise is believed to have sustained unknown damages during the Rimau mission and was noted to be leaking fuel. Heavy weather was also encountered during the return trip to Fremantle. The submarine's journey was mainly on the surface during heavy rainstorms. Porpoise was required to dive somewhere in the Lombok Strait nearly losing control as it plunged violently in the strong currents and eddies associated with that strait.

After repairing at Fremantle, Porpoise sailed to Ceylon in November 1944 and operated from that area for the rest of the war.

== Sinking ==
In January 1945, HMS Porpoise was laying mines in the Straits of Malacca in the vicinity of Penang. On 9 January, Porpoise signalled confirming their mission had been successfully carried out. The submarine was never heard from again.

Japanese records show that radio direction finders at Penang picked up her position and subchaser CH-8 was dispatched to the area and conducted an attack on Porpoise. Later that day, a submarine was spotted and bombed by aircraft in the vicinity of Penang. The aircraft scored a hit with one of its bombs and the submarine sank, bringing up a large oil slick. CH-8 used its sonar and found the submarine still sitting on the bottom.

An expedition in 2011 researched the alleged sinking location and came to the conclusion that the target in question was not HMS Porpoise, but rather the wreck of UIT-23 (ex-Italian Reginaldo Giuliani) torpedoed by HMS Tally-Ho in February 1944.

== Publications ==
- Caruana, Joseph (2012). "Emergency Victualling of Malta During WWII". Warship International. LXIX (4): 357–364. ISSN 0043-0374.
- Colledge, J. J.; Warlow, Ben (2006) [1969]. Ships of the Royal Navy: The Complete Record of All Fighting Ships of the Royal Navy from the 15th Century to the Present (3rd Rev ed.). London: Chatham Publishing. ISBN 978-1-86176-281-8. OCLC 67375475.
