= Bombing of Helsinki in World War II =

Soviet bombing of Helsinki
- Part of the Winter War, Continuation War, Eastern Front of World War II
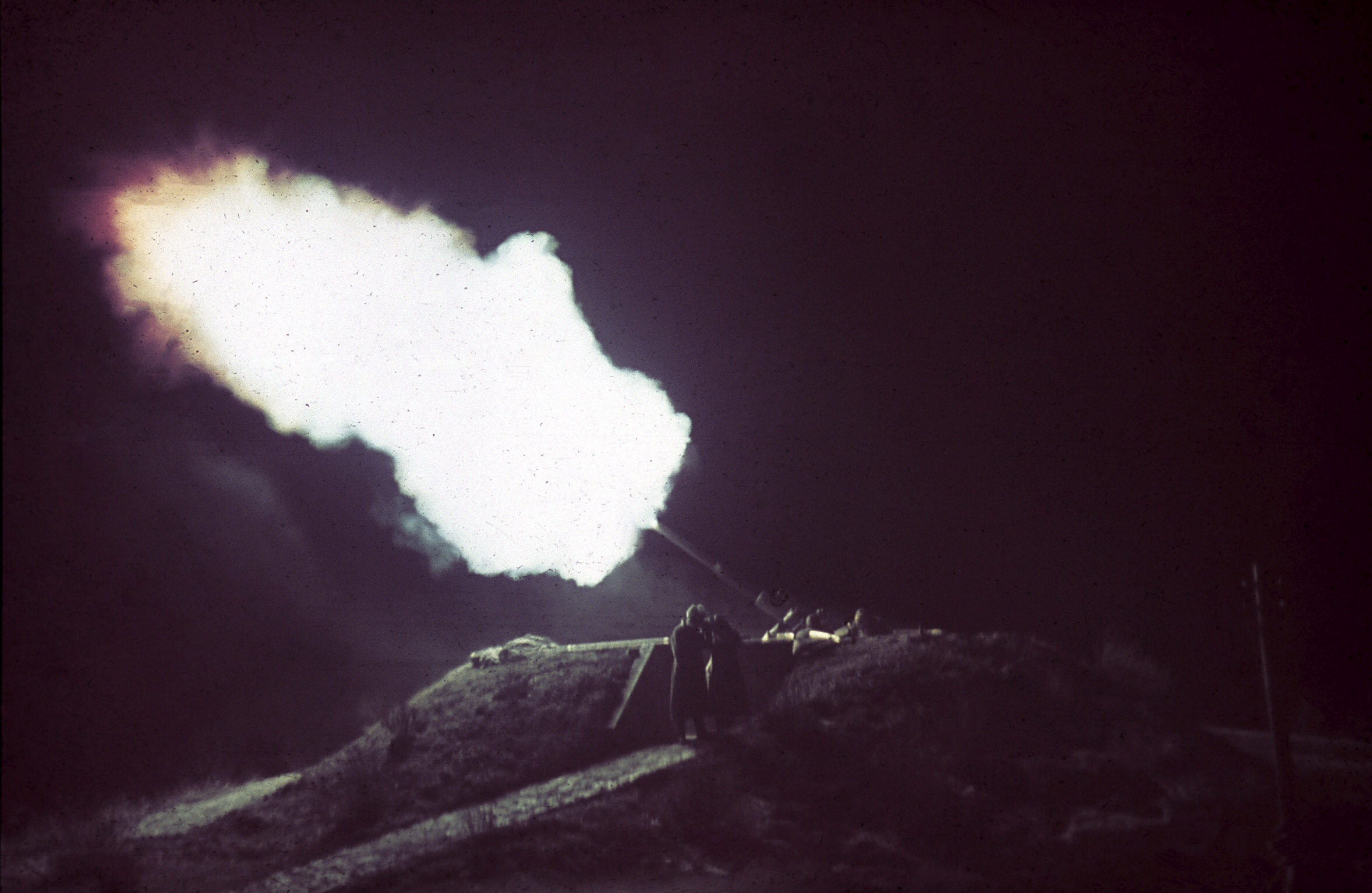
- Bofors anti-aircraft gun firing at enemy bombers. Taivaskallio, Helsinki. November 1942
Date	1939-1940, 1941-1944
Location	Helsinki, Finland
Result	Finnish victory; Soviet failure to destroy the city; Soviet failure to force the Finns to peace negotiations

Belligerents
Finland	Soviet Union

Commanders and leaders
(Finland) Carl Gustaf Mannerheim (Finland) Jarl Lundqvist	(Soviet Union) Joseph Stalin (Soviet Union) Alexander Novikov

Casualties and losses
146 killed 356 wounded	25 aircraft

Helsinki, the capital of Finland, was bombed repeatedly during World War II. Between 1939 and 1944, Finland was subjected to a number of bombing campaigns by the Soviet Union. The largest were three raids in February 1944, which have been called The Great Raids Against Helsinki.

== Helsinki's air defence ==
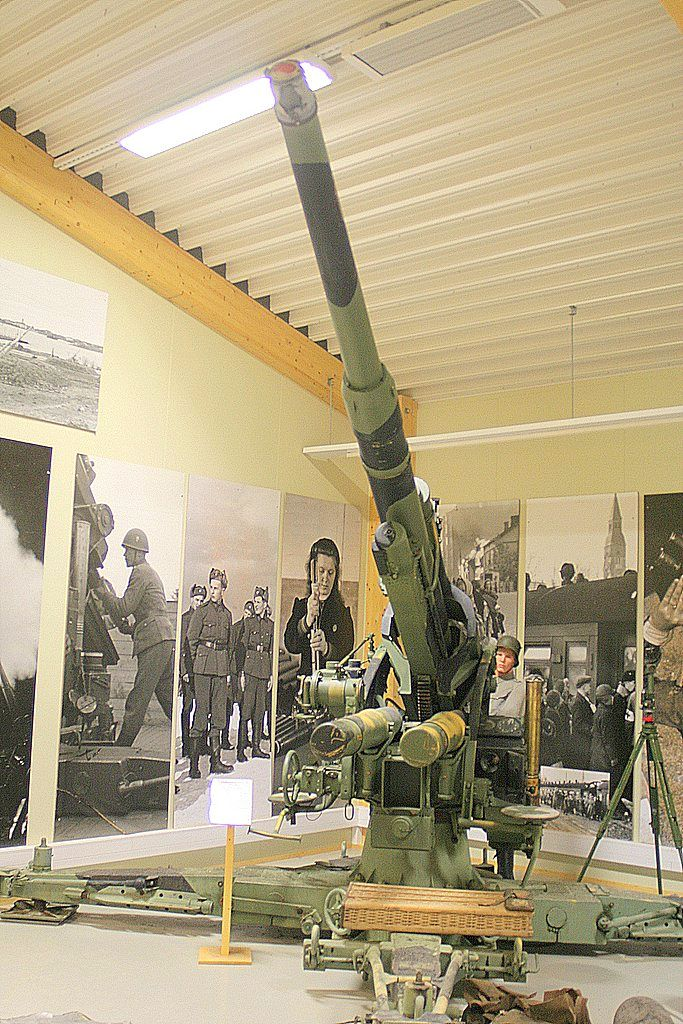
An 88 mm AA-gun at the Finnish anti-aircraft museum.

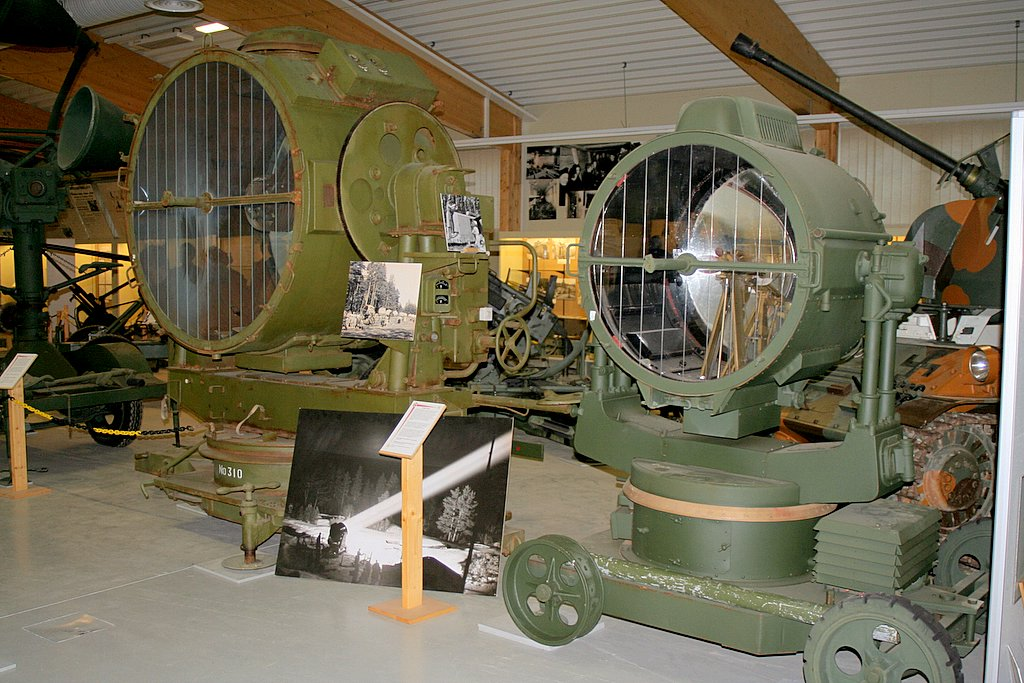
Search lights at the Finnish anti-aircraft museum.

In the autumn of 1939, Helsinki was protected by the 1st Anti Aircraft Regiment consisting of four heavy anti-aircraft batteries of three to four guns each, one light AA battery and one AA machine gun company.

The air defence of Helsinki was significantly strengthened from the spring of 1943 onwards under the lead of Colonel Pekka Jokipaltio. During the Continuation War, Germany provided two early warning radars and four gun laying radars to Helsinki, further, 18 very effective German heavy 88 mm AA guns were also placed in Helsinki. The new six-gun batteries were grouped at Lauttasaari, Käpylä and in Santahamina. By February 1944 Helsinki was protected by 13 light and heavy AA-batteries. Air defences included 77 heavy AA-guns, 41 light AA-guns, 36 searchlights, 13 acoustic locators and 6 radars in addition to visual spotters and the Finnish Navy's anti-aircraft units. Germany also provided some night fighter support against the Soviet air raids.

The air defence command system was based on the German system and was quite effective – key personnel had trained in Germany. Manpower shortages made the air defence also use 16-year-old boy volunteers from Suojeluskunta (White Guard) to man the guns and young girls of the Lotta Svärd organization to man searchlights.

The Germans had also based a night fighter unit, consisting of 12 modified Bf 109G-6 night fighters in Helsinki on 12 February 1944 and the German night fighter direction vessel Togo cruised in the Gulf of Finland between Tallinn and Helsinki.

Helsinki's air defences prioritized stopping bombers from reaching the city over the destruction of air targets. In a special type of barrage, several batteries would fire a wall of flak in front of the approaching bombers in an attempt to scare them into dropping their payloads too early and breaking away. AA shells had been jury-rigged by drilling the fuze-hole larger and filling the extra space with magnesium mixed with aluminium, turning their explosion from a dull red to a searing white.

== Soviet long-distance bomb group (ADD) ==
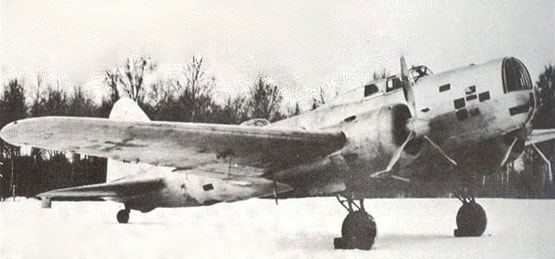
A Soviet DB-3, used extensively by the Soviet air force in the opening stages of the Winter War.

The bombing of Finland was generally conducted by the long-range bombing and reconnaissance group of the Soviet Air Force (VVS), the Aviatsiya Dalnego Deystviya (ADD). This group was directly subordinated to Stavka. During the February bombings of 1944, the ADD was reinforced with other units. The ADD commander was Marshal Aleksandr Golovanov. Bombing raids were also sometimes done by the VVS and the BF (Baltic Fleet air group).

The Soviet bomber fleet was very diverse. Most of the aircraft were twin-engined Ilyushin-4, Lisunov Li-2, North American B-25 Mitchell and Douglas A-20 bombers. The B-25s and the A-20s had been supplied to the Soviet Union as Lend Lease material from the United States. The Lisunov Li-2 was a Soviet bomber version of the American Douglas DC-3. There were also some heavy four-engined bombers participating in the bombings, e.g. the Petlyakov Pe-8.

== Civil defence ==
Before the war, Helsinki had an extensive civil defense system. By a city decree of 1934, bomb shelters were constructed in all high-rise building basements. These were merely basement rooms with reinforced walls in order to withstand nearby bomb impacts. All buildings were required to have an appointed civil protection supervisor who was not in the reserves or the armed forces, and as such was usually unfit for military service. That person was tasked to see that all occupants made it to the shelter in an orderly fashion.

There were a few larger shelters built into solid rock, but it was not possible to fit all citizens of Helsinki into them. Some hospitals were also equipped with subterranean shelters in which patients could be relocated during air raids. Others, such as the Children's Hospital, were moved outside the city. One hospital was entirely underground, below the Finnish Red Cross building.

== Winter War ==
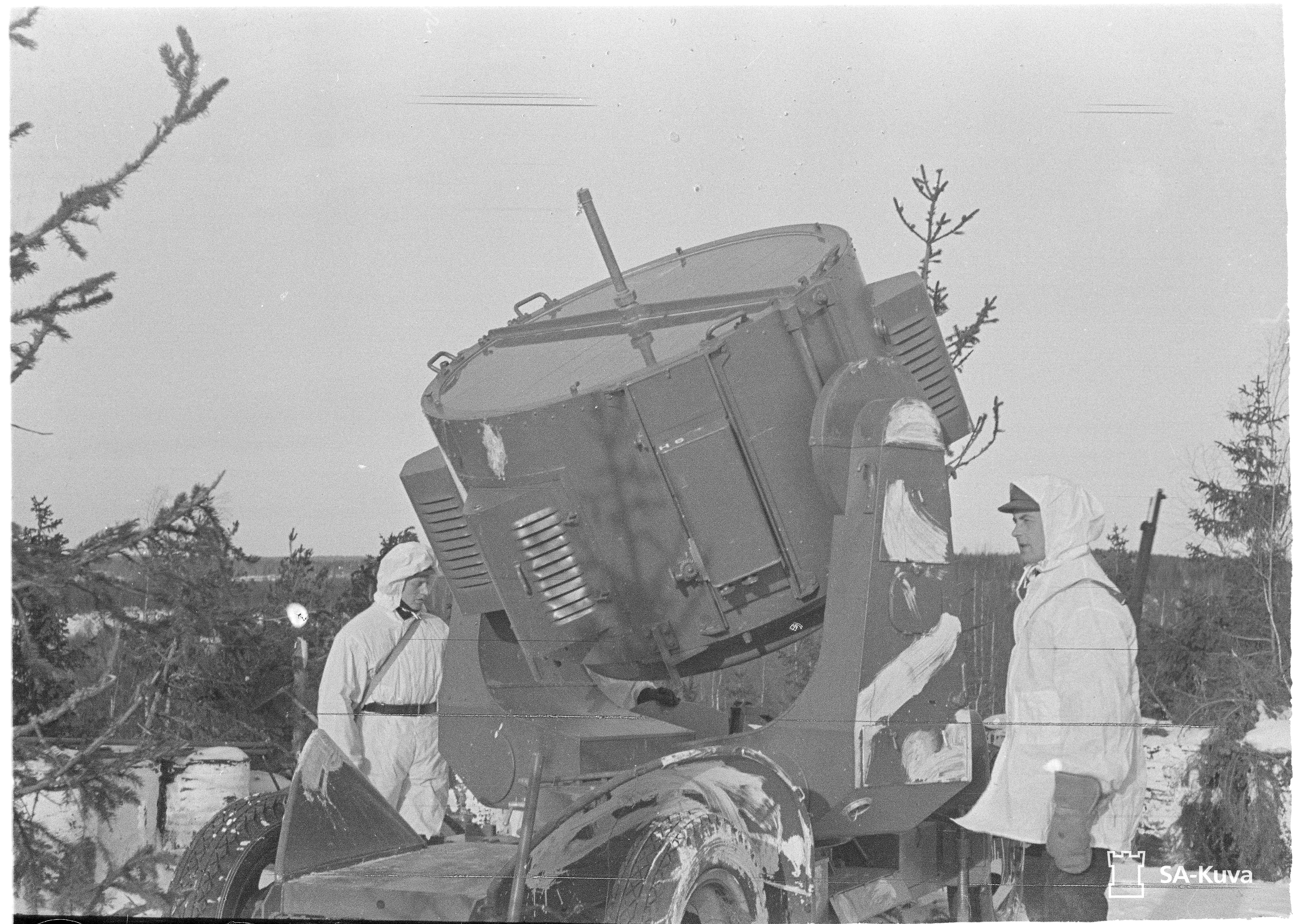
Anti-aircraft searchlight on Pitkänkallionmäki (Haukilahti, Espoo), February 1940.

The first bombing of Helsinki occurred the very day Finland was invaded, on 30 November 1939. On the morning of the first air raid, Soviet bombers flew over Helsinki and dropped several high explosive and a dozen incendiary bombs, but did little permanent damage. The chief airport buildings were not hit and were untouched throughout the war.

They also dropped leaflets with the inscription:

You know we have bread - don't starve. Soviet Russia will not harm the Finnish people. Their disaster is due to the wrong leadership. Mannerheim and Cajander must go. After this peace will come!

By the afternoon, eight Soviet Ilyushin DB-3 long-range bombers of the Black Sea Fleet air arm bombed Helsinki after returning back from Russarö on a futile naval attack mission. The bombers dropped their payload of 600 bombs on Helsinki with the intent of offloading them before returning to their airbase at Kronstadt. The first two air raids resulted in the deaths of approximately 100 Finnish civilians. When the alarms sounded in the afternoon for the second air raid, people did not rush to shelters. One girl finished a game of tennis and dressed leisurely, and others stared at the sky.

The bombs fell in two groups: around the Technical High School leaving one five-story wing blazing; and behind the Parliament house and close to the main city bus station. Finnish authorities later announced that the second air raid in the afternoon resulted in 61 deaths and 120 wounded; the heaviest casualties from any one air raid in the war.

The following morning on 1 December, another wave of Soviet bombers were sent to bomb Helsinki. Despite dropping their payload over Helsinki, the unescorted bombers were intercepted by the Finnish air force.

Helsinki was bombed a total of eight times during the Winter War. Some 350 bombs fell on the city, resulting in the deaths of 97 people and the wounding of 260. In all, 55 buildings were destroyed.

The Soviet bombings led to harsh reactions abroad. US President Roosevelt asked the Soviets not to bomb Finnish cities. Soviet Foreign Minister Molotov replied to Roosevelt, "Soviet aircraft have not been bombing cities, but airfields, you can't see that from 8,000 kilometers away in America".

== Continuation War ==
Helsinki fared somewhat better during the Continuation War since Soviet bombers focused mainly on German forces in the Baltic states. Helsinki was bombed 39 times during the Continuation War. 245 people were killed and 646 wounded, mostly in the three large raids in 1944.

	Raids	Bombs	Dead	Wounded
Winter War	8	about 350	97^{1}	260
1941	9	about 80	33^{2}	210
1942	17	about 70	68^{3}	167
1943	13	about 110	3	21
^{1} 91 deaths on 30 November 1939^{2} 22 deaths on 9 July 1941^{3} 51 deaths on 8 November 1942

=== 8 November 1942 bombing ===
During the daytime on 8 November 1942, a lone Petlyakov Pe-2 was on a reconnaissance mission over Helsinki. The plane dropped only a single aerial bomb at the intersection between the streets of Yrjönkatu and Roobertinkatu. There were 51 killed and 120 were injured near a movie theatre, where the film The Three Musketeers was playing at the time. Therefore, the victims were mainly children and youth.

=== Great raids of February 1944 ===
A Finnish poster urging all citizens to participate in air raid precautions and civil defence work.

In February 1944, the Soviet Union launched three massive bombing raids against Helsinki. The aim was to break the Finnish fighting spirit and to force the Finns to the peace table. The raids were conducted on the nights of 6–7, 16-17 and 26–27 February. Joseph Stalin obtained British and American support for the measure at the Tehran Conference in 1943. In that manner, the Soviets hoped to force Finland to break its ties with Germany and agree to a peace settlement.

Finnish air defence forces counted 2,121 bombers in the three raids of February 1944, which dropped more than 16,000 bombs. Of the 34,200 shots fired against the bombers, 21,200 were with heavy AA artillery, and 12,900 were with light AA artillery. The Finns were able to conceive an effective plan to divert enemy aircraft away from the heart of the city. In order to deceive Soviet pathfinders, fires were lit on the islands outside the city and searchlights were only used east of the city, thereby leading the pathfinders to believe that it was the city.

The decoy system worked surprisingly well. After the final bombing on February 26, the Russians believed their strategic goal had been achieved. Meanwhile, Finland spread false reports to the media, via Swedish channels, claiming Helsinki had been completely destroyed. When a Soviet delegation arrived in Helsinki after the September 1944 armistice, they were shocked by the city being largely intact. Enraged by the deception, Stalin dismissed Marshal Golovanov, head of the Strategic Air Force.

Only 530 bombs fell within the city itself. Most of the population of Helsinki had left the city, and the casualties were lower than in other cities bombed during the war. Of the 22–25 Soviet bombers lost in the raids, 18–21 were destroyed by AA fire, and four were shot down by German night fighters.

==== First great raid: 6–7 February ====
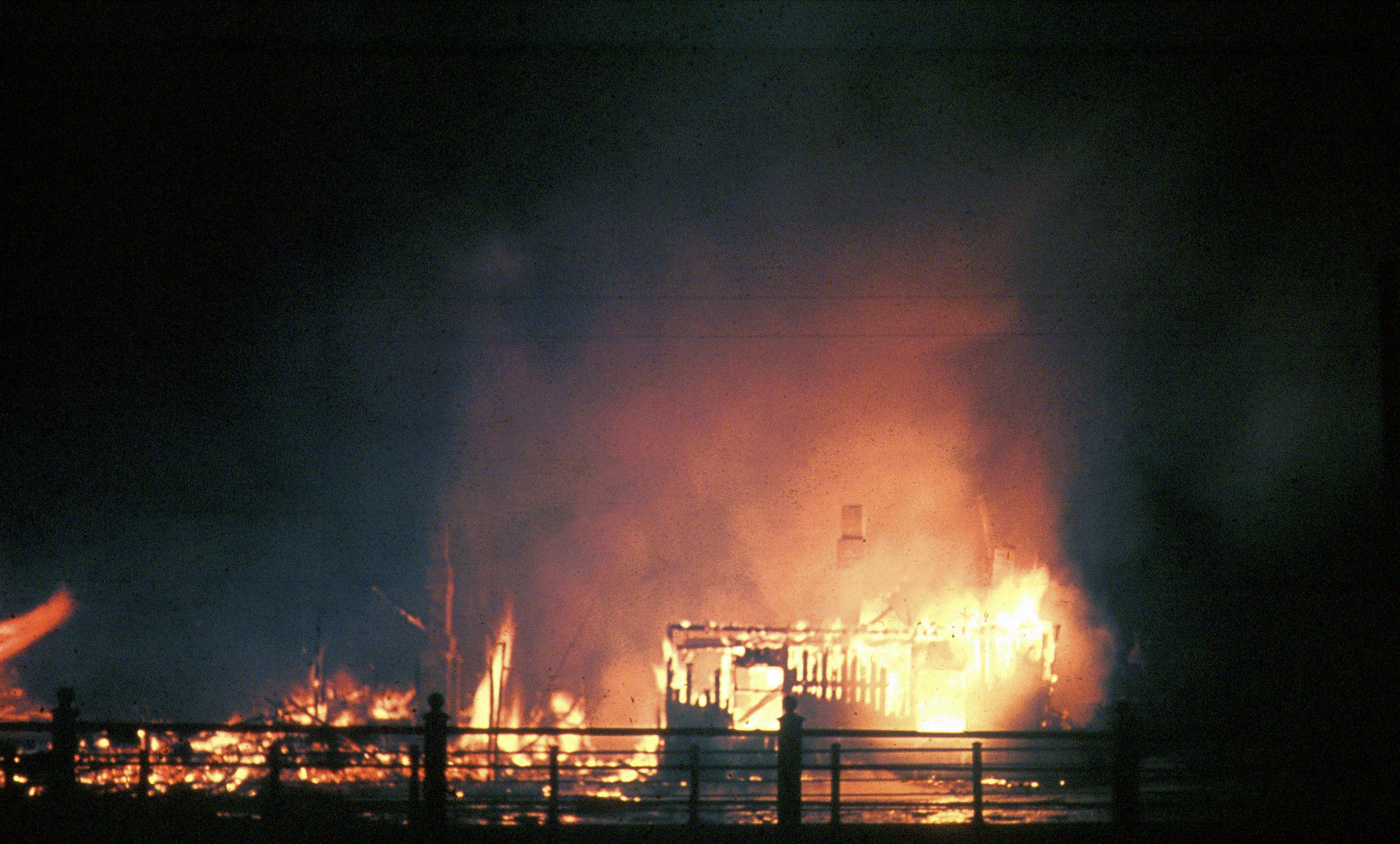
Bombing destruction in Helsinki, the night of February 6–7, 1944.

The first night saw the most destruction.

The first bombs fell at 19:23. Some 350 bombs fell within the city and approximately 2,500 bombs outside Helsinki. The total number of bombs dropped (included the ones that fell into the sea) amounted to some 6,990. Approximately 730 bomber aircraft participated in the raid. The bombers arrived in two waves: 18:51–21:40 on 6 February and 00:57–04:57 on 7 February. Most of the damage was done in the district of Katajanokka, and the streets Porthaninkatu, Kasarmikatu, Kaisaniemenkatu and Vuorikatu suffered considerable bomb damage as well, and the Technical University (Tekninen korkeakoulu) at Hietalahdentori was destroyed.

Although it had been the most massive raid, the damages were again quite limited: 21 people were killed and 35 wounded; 59 buildings were destroyed and 135 damaged.

The defence fired 122 barrages. The light AA artillery fired 2,745 shots and the heavy AA artillery fired 7,719 shots. The Finnish Air Force had no night fighters at this time.

There were 100 killed and 300 injured. More than 160 buildings were damaged, including the Soviet embassy, on the corner of Bulevardi and Albertinkatu.

==== Second great raid: 16–17 February ====
Since Tallinn had been bombed heavily and intelligence pointed out that a raid might be directed at Helsinki, the Helsinki air defence took some active measures.

After the first raid, a German night fighter group of 12 Messerschmitt Bf 109G-6 fighters with special night fighting equipment was transferred to the Helsinki-Malmi Airport from the Estonian front. These managed to shoot down six bombers during the following two raids. The anti-aircraft batteries fired 184 barrages and downed two bombers. Heavy AA batteries fired 12,238 shots and light AA batteries fired 5,709 shots.

Most of the population of Helsinki had voluntarily evacuated to the countryside and the remainder were prepared to take shelter at the first warning, which reduced casualties significantly.

This time 383 bombers participated. While 4,317 bombs fell on the city, the sea and in the surrounding area, only 100 bombs fell within the city. The warning was sounded at 20:12 and the bombers approached again in two waves: 20:12–23:10 on 16 February and 23:45–05:49 on 17 February. The first wave tried to concentrate the bombing by approaching from different directions. In the second wave, the aircraft came in smaller groups from the east. Finnish intelligence had intercepted messages one hour and 40 minutes before the raid and warned the air defence, which had time to prepare. The air defence sounded the warning 49 minutes before the raid. Radar picked up the first aircraft 34 minutes before the beginning of the bombings.

This time, casualty figures were much lower: 25 died and 29 were injured. 27 buildings were destroyed and 53 were damaged.

==== Third great raid: 26–27 February ====
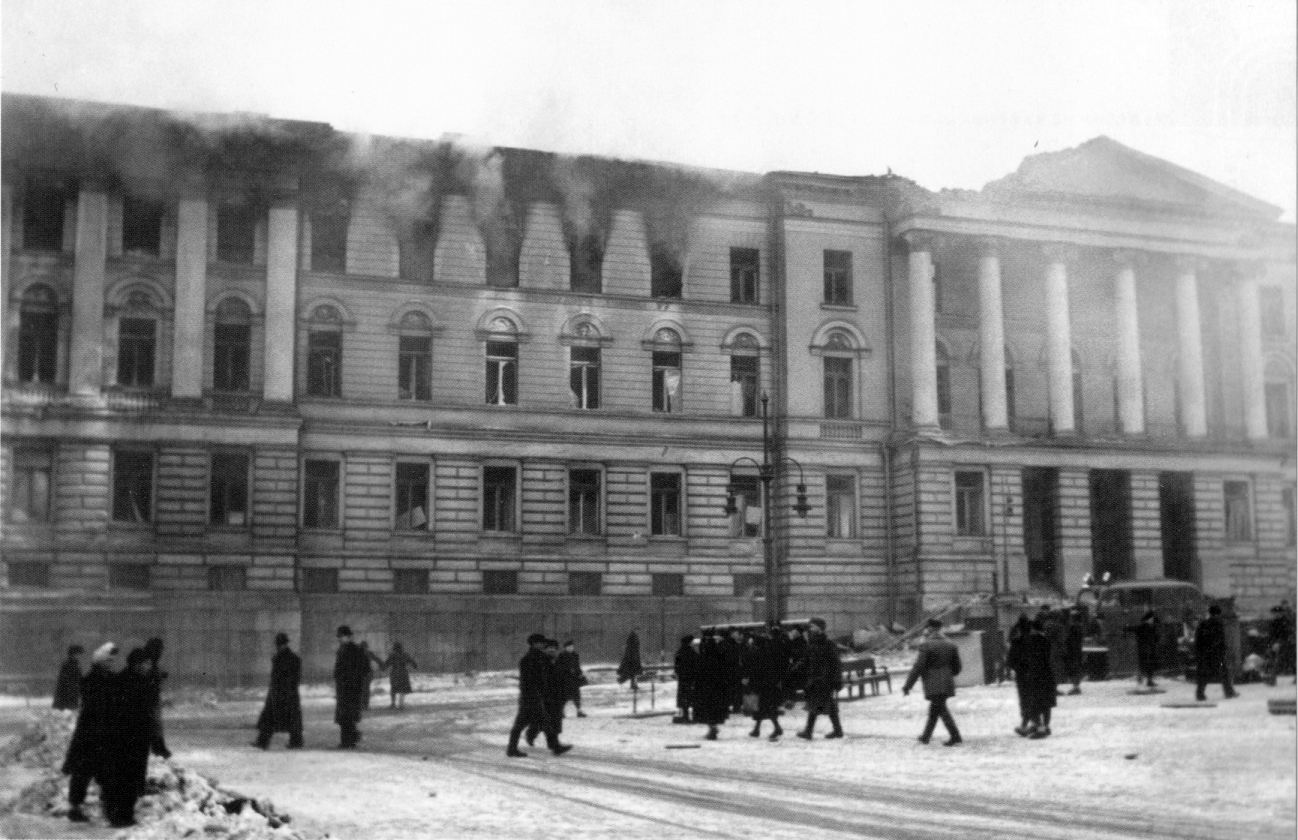
University of Helsinki main building after the third raid.

On the evening of 26 February, a single Soviet reconnaissance aircraft was spotted over the city. It was a sign of the coming attack. The weather was clear, which helped the attackers. Again, Finnish Radio Intelligence intercepted messages of the forthcoming raid, this time 1 hour and 28 minutes before the bombing commenced, but the Soviets tried to maintain radio silence.

Five minutes later, the air surveillance grid, manned by Lotta Svärd auxiliaries, reported approaching bombers. A silent alarm was sounded in the city in good time before the raid. Streetlights were turned off, trams and trains were stopped and radio transmissions ended. In that manner, the enemy had more difficulty in finding its target. All of the citizens knew that they had to take cover.

The first bombers were picked up by Finnish radar at approximately 18:30, 25 minutes before they arrived. A few minutes later, the night fighters took off and flew to their predesignated positions. The AA-artillery had also been alerted. The air raid warning was sounded at 18:45. AA-batteries opened up fire at 18:53. At 19:07 the first bombs fell.

This last great raid differed from the two previous ones. The battle lasted for some 11 hours and was divided into three different phases. The first one was in the evening and lasted for four hours and concentrated the attacks against the city. The second one was mainly focused on the defending AA artillery but with little success. The last wave hoped to finally flatten the city, but most of the aircraft turned away when met with fierce anti-aircraft barrages and night fighters. The all-clear signal was finally sounded at about 6:30 in the morning of 27 February.

The heavy AA artillery fired 14,240 shots and the light AA artillery 4,432 shots. Nine Soviet bombers were downed.

This time, 896 bombers participated in the raid on Helsinki. They dropped 5,182 bombs of which only 290 fell on the city itself.

==== Damage of the great raids ====
Helsinki and many other European cities endured bombing raids throughout the Second World War, the Finnish capital fared better than many others because of the efficiency of its anti-aircraft and deception measures. Only 5% of the bombs fell within the city, and some of these fell in uninhabited park areas causing little damage. Some 2,000 bombers participated in the three great raids on the city and dropped some 2,600 tons of bombs. Of the 146 who died, six were soldiers; 356 were wounded. 109 buildings were destroyed. 300 were damaged by shrapnel and 111 were set on fire. The Soviet Air Force lost 25 aircraft. The Soviet embassy on the corner of Bulevardi and Albertinkatu was hit by bombs and burnt down completely.

After the war, the Allied Control Commission led by Soviet General Andrei Zhdanov came to Helsinki. Zhdanov was perplexed by the limited damage that the city had sustained. The Soviet leadership thought that it had destroyed the city completely and that the bombings had forced the Finns to the peace table.

=== Finnish response ===
The Finnish Air Force responded to the air raids with a series of night infiltration bombings of ADD airfields near Leningrad. Finnish bombers, Junkers Ju 88s, Bristol Blenheims, and Dornier Do 17s, tailed or in some cases even joined formation with returning Soviet bombers over the Gulf of Finland and followed them to their bases. Once most Soviet bombers had landed the Finnish bombers approached to bomb both the landed and still-landing Soviet bombers and then they escaped in the ensuing confusion. The first major night infiltration bombing took place on 9 March 1944 and they lasted until May 1944. Soviet casualties from the raids could not be estimated reliably.

== See also ==
- 14th Searchlight Battery
- FAB-5000 bomb

== Sources ==
- Martti Helminen, Aslak Lukander: Helsingin suurpommitukset helmikuussa 1944, 2004, WSOY, ISBN 951-0-28823-3
