= 14th Searchlight Battery (Finland) =

Finnish military unit

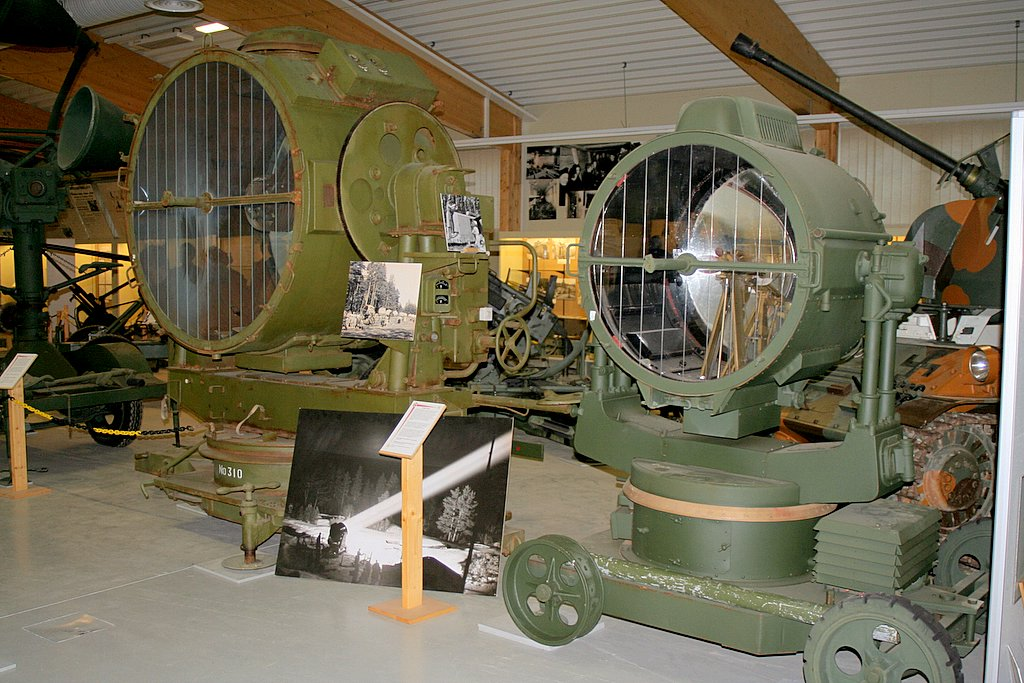
Searchlights in Tuusula anti-aircraft museum

The 14th Searchlight Battery (Finnish: 14. valonheitinpatteri (14.Vh.Ptri)) was a Finnish anti-aircraft searchlight battery formed from women of the Lotta Svärd organization ("searchlight lottas", Finnish: valonheitinlotat) at the end of the Continuation War. The battery was formed to free some men for other tasks and was used in the air-defence of Helsinki. The battery was the only armed unit in Finnish Army made up from women that was organized as a military unit fit for combat duty. The searchlight battery was operational from late summer 1944 to the end of the Continuation War but did not see action.

== Background ==
As the air-defences of Helsinki were improved in spring 1944 after the winter bombings it was decided to replace some of the personnel in searchlight units with women to ease manpower shortage. Three hundred women were selected from students working already in air surveillance duties, of whom 215 arrived for searchlight training. The trainees were mainly from Helsinki University of Technology, University of Helsinki and Ateneum, but also from schools in Turku and Tampere. The training began on 31 May 1944 in Laajasalo in Helsinki, but was suspended already on 9 June since there was no guarantee that the women would continue to serve after fall (student work responsibility only covered summer months). The training continued after the women expressed interest in the task and pledged to serve for as long as the war demanded or a minimum of one year. After this the number of trainees was set at 145 and the training was concentrated to Anti-aircraft regiment 1 (Finnish: Ilmatorjuntarykmentti 1 (ItR 1)) in Helsinki, while the training in 1st Independent Anti-aircraft Battalion (Finnish: 1. Erillinen ilmatorjuntapatteristo (1.Er.ItPsto)) in Turku and 2nd Independent Anti-aircraft Battalion (Finnish: 2. Erillinen ilmatorjuntapatteristo (2.Er.ItPsto)) in Tampere was discontinued. Captain K. H. Pentti led the training while Inkeri Simola acted as the Lotta leader. Simola was later succeeded by Aino Airamo. A voluntary written commitment to remain in service as well as passing a medical examination for continuous outdoor duty was required from the women who wished to serve in the searchlight battery.

== Training ==
The women completed their training successfully. They were divided into four groups: 25 searchlight team leaders, 30 acoustic locator operators, 63 searchlight operators and 29 generator operators. Three Second Lieutenants, 30 non-commissioned officers and nine soldiers formed the training staff. The course included several military subjects that had not been taught to Lottas before. Armed service caused a minor crisis for the Lotta Svärd organization, which had emphasized a principle of nonviolence. Because of Soviet agent and invasion danger the Lotta Svärd central committee had to consent to arming the women in the searchlight battery. The leader of the Lotta Svärd organization, Fanni Luukkonen, said that armed service for women meant the "death of womanhood" (Finnish: "naiseuden kuolema"), but that the wartime situation demanded extraordinary measures. The weapon used by the women was an Italian Terni military rifle that was also used by other anti-aircraft units.

== Active service ==
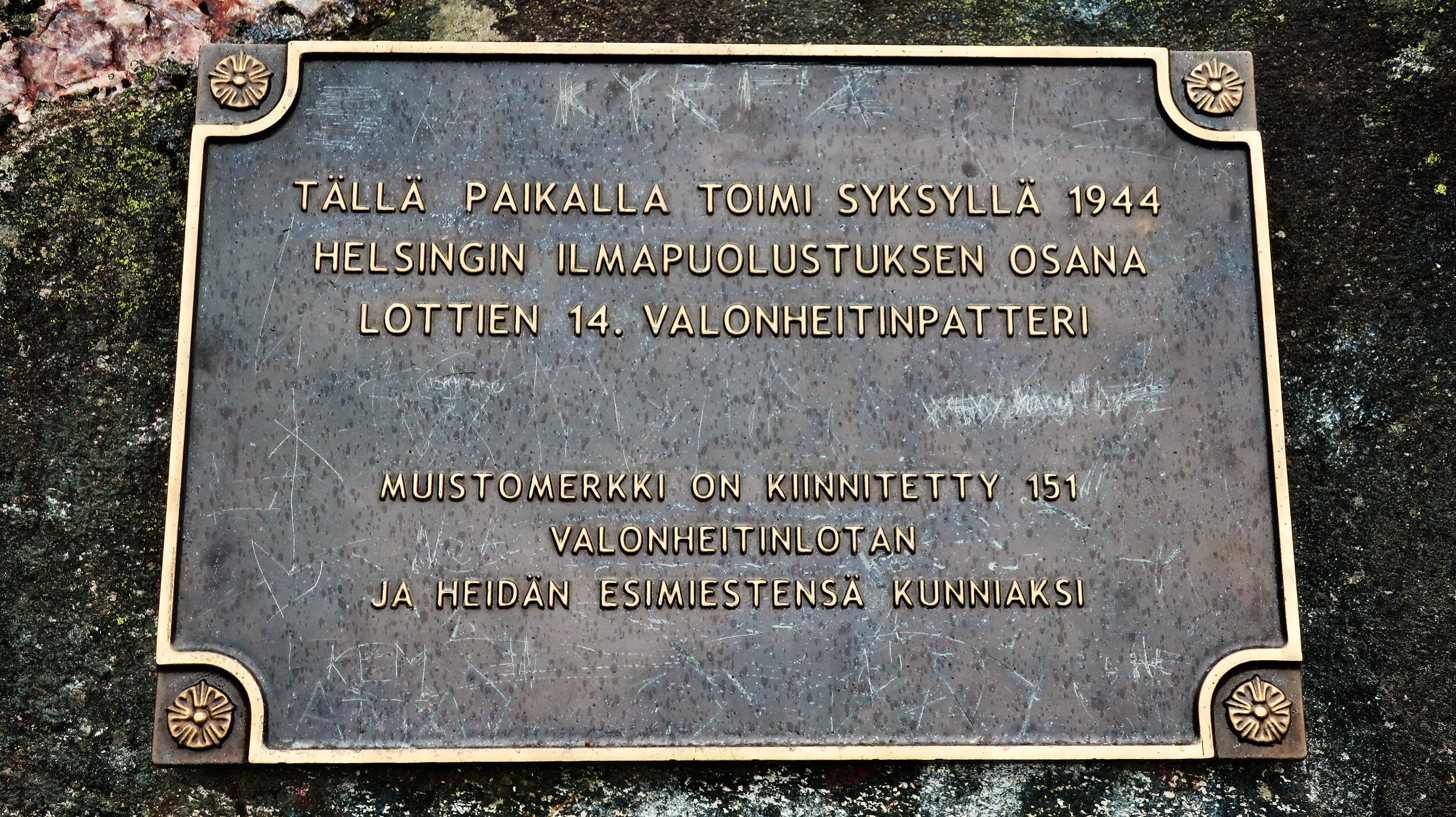
Memorial plaque of the 14th Searchlight Battery in Espoo

The training ended on 26 July and on 7 August the women were formed into 14th Searchlight Battery with call sign "tyttö" ("girl") and attached to Anti-aircraft Regiment 1. The battery was equipped with twelve searchlights and six acoustic locators. The battery operated as per normal military chain of command structure and in early August it was assigned to guard the least dangerous sector in the North-Western Helsinki. The battery did not see action and after armistice it was disbanded by the order of commander of the Airforce on 24 September.

== See also ==
- Auxiliary Territorial Service - British women's branch that also operated searchlight units
