= Grampus-class submarine =

Type of British submarines in service before and during WWII

- HMS Porpoise

Class overview
- Name: Grampus class
- Operators: Royal Navy Kriegsmarine
- Preceded by: River class
- Succeeded by: T class
- In commission: 1933—1945
- Completed: 6
- Lost: 5
- Retired: 1

General characteristics
- Type: Submarine
- Displacement: 1,810 tons surfaced; 2,157 tons submerged
- Length: 293 ft (89 m)
- Beam: 25 ft 6 in (7.77 m)
- Draught: 16 ft 10 in (5.13 m)
- Propulsion: 2 shaft, diesel (3,300 hp; 2,500 kW) plus electric (1,630 hp; 1,220 kW)
- Speed: 15.5 knots (28.7 km/h; 17.8 mph) surfaced; 8.75 knots (16.21 km/h; 10.07 mph) submerged
- Complement: 59
- Armament: 6 × 21 in torpedo tubes (bow); 12 torpedoes; 1 × QF 4-inch (101.6 mm) Mk XII deck gun; 50 mines

The Grampus-class submarines were a group of minelaying submarines built for the Royal Navy in the late 1930s. These boats are sometimes referred to as the Porpoise class from the single prototype, HMS Porpoise built in 1932. Five boats to a modified design were built between 1936 and 1938. The ships were all named after marine mammals.

== Design ==
The naval mines were stored in a special "gallery" with a conveyor belt built into the outer casing as pioneered by the converted M-class submarine HMS M3. These boats were of a saddle tank type.

== Service ==
Boats of this class were used extensively in the Mediterranean, particularly as part of the supply effort to the besieged island of Malta in a service nicknamed the "magic carpet".

Only one, HMS Rorqual, survived the war.

== Boats in class ==
Ship	Builder	Launched	Fate
HMS Porpoise (N14)	Vickers, Barrow	30 August 1932	Sunk by Japanese aircraft in the Malacca straits, 16 January 1945.
HMS Grampus (N56)	Chatham Dockyard	25 February 1936	Sunk by Italian torpedo boats Circe and Clio off Sicily 16 June 1940.
HMS Narwhal (N45)	Vickers, Barrow	29 August 1935	Sunk 30 July 1940 by German aircraft near Norway.
HMS Rorqual (N74)	Vickers, Barrow	21 July 1936	Arrived Newport to be broken up 17 March 1946.
HMS Cachalot (N83)	Scotts	2 December 1937	Sunk by Italian torpedo boat Generale Achille Papa off Cyrenaica 30 July 1941.
HMS Seal (N37)	Chatham Dockyard	27 September 1938	Captured by the Germans in the Kattegat 4 May 1940 after sustaining mine damage, commissioned as the UB, scuttled 3 May 1945, but later raised and scrapped.
