= HMS Narwhal (N45) =

Submarine of the Royal Navy

- HMS Narwhal (N45)

History

United Kingdom
- Name: HMS Narwhal
- Builder: Vickers-Armstrongs, Barrow
- Laid down: 29 May 1934
- Launched: 29 August 1935
- Commissioned: 28 February 1936
- Fate: Sunk on 23 July 1940
- Badge

General characteristics
- Class & type: Grampus-class mine-laying submarine
- Displacement: 1,810 tons surfaced; 2,157 tons submerged
- Length: 293 ft (89 m)
- Beam: 25 ft 6 in (7.77 m)
- Draught: 16 ft 10 in (5.13 m)
- Propulsion: 2 shaft, Diesel (3300 hp) plus electric (1630 hp)
- Speed: 15.5 knots surfaced; 8.75 knots submerged
- Complement: 59
- Armament: 6 × 21 inch (533 mm) torpedo tubes (bow); 12 torpedoes; 1 × 4 inch deck gun; 50 mines

HMS Narwhal (N45) was one of the six ship class of Grampus-class mine-laying submarine of the Royal Navy. She was built by Vickers-Armstrongs, Barrow and launched 29 August 1935. She served in the Second World War in home waters. She was lost in the North Sea on 23 July 1940, probably sunk by German aircraft.

== Career ==
Narwhal had a brief but eventful career in wartime service. In February 1940 she helped HMS Imogen and Inglefield to sink the German U-boat U-63 south east of the Shetland Islands and in May she torpedoed and sank the German troop transport Buenos Aires and torpedoed and damaged the troop transport Bahia Castillo. Bahia Castillo reached port but was declared a total loss.

Most of Narwhal's sinkings were caused by her mines. The German auxiliary minesweepers M 1302 / Schwaben, M 1102 / H.A.W. Möllerthe, Gnom 7, Kobold 1 and Kobold 3; the German minesweeper M 11; German auxiliary submarine chaser UJ D / Treff VIII; the armed trawler V 1109 / Antares and the Swedish cargo ship Haga were all sunk on mines laid by Narwhal.

Ships damaged by mines laid by Narwhal included the armed trawler V 403 / Deutschland, the German cargo ships Togo and Clara M. Russ. The auxiliary minesweeper M 1101 / Fock & Hubert and the German cargo ship Palime also struck some of Narwhal's mines. They were successfully beached, but declared total losses.

Credit is often given to Narwhal for sinking the Norwegian fishing vessel Arild, but in reality Arild hit a German defensive mine.

Narwhal may also have sunk the German U-boat U-1 which disappeared on patrol on 6 April 1940, having been scheduled to sail unknowingly through a minefield Narwhal had laid earlier that day. Alternatively, Narwhal's sister, Porpoise, reported firing upon an unknown submarine, which may account for U-1's loss.

== Sinking ==
Narwhal left Blyth on 22 July 1940. On the afternoon of 23 July a German aircraft reported attacking a submarine in the area where Narwhal should have been. The Germans believed this to be HMS Porpoise, Narwhal’s sister ship, but as Narwhal did not report again, it was assumed this attack sank her.

In 2017 a Polish expedition in search of ORP Orzel found a previously unknown wreck which they identified to be most likely HMS Narwhal based on sonar data.
