= Gulf of Finland U-boat campaign =

World War II naval battles

Gulf of Finland campaign
- Part of the Baltic Sea campaign of the Eastern Front of World War II
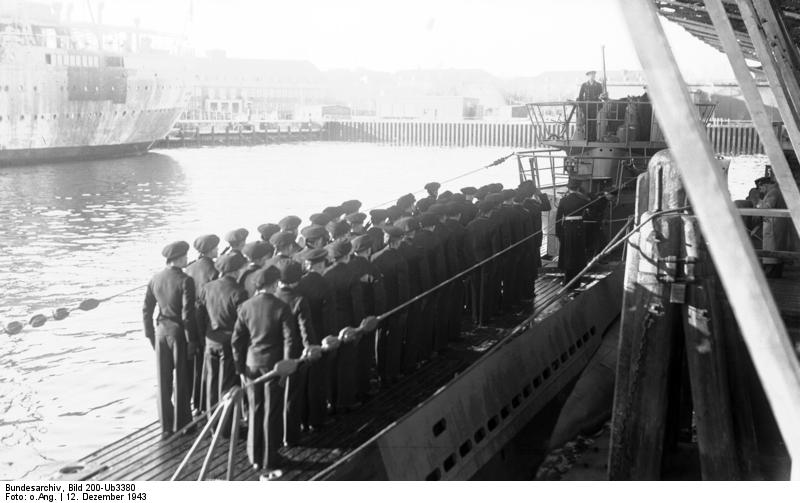
- U-250 being commissioned, 12 December 1943
Date	1944–1945
Location	Baltic Sea
Result	Allied victory

Belligerents
Germany; Finland (until September 1944)	Soviet Union; Finland (from September 1944)

Commanders and leaders
(Nazi Germany) Albrecht Brandi	

Strength
13 u-boats (first phase)	Anti-submarine boats

Casualties and losses
5 u-boats sunk and 1 damaged.	1 Finnish merchant sunk 1 Soviet landing craft sunk 1 Soviet survey vessel and 2 barges sunk Finnish minelayer Louhi sunk 1 Soviet minesweeper sunk 4 Soviet small submarine chasers sunk and 2 damaged 4 Soviet small minesweepers sunk and 1 damaged 1 motor torpedo boat damaged 4 Finnish fishing boats sunk and 1 damaged

The Gulf of Finland U-boat campaign lasted in the Gulf of Finland during the World War II against the Soviet Union between summer 1944 and spring 1945. During the campaign Finland switched sides and joined the Allies.

== Background ==
The Baltic Sea proved a difficult theatre of operation for submarines as experienced by Soviets during the Soviet submarine Baltic Sea campaign in 1942 and during the failed operation in 1943. The German command dispatched the following units in Kotka from the end of June to operate against the local Soviet shipping in the Gulf: U-481, U-748, U-1193, U-242, U-250, U-348, U-370, U-475, U-479, U-679, U-717, U-745, U-1001.

== Main campaign ==
German operations until the Moscow Armistice, when Finland switched to fight alongside the Allies:

On 15 July 1944, U-679 was attacked by small Soviet boats: during a gunnery battle, the motor torpedo boat TK-57 suffered damages and two of her torpedoes barely missed the submarine. U-679 fled under cover of Finnish ground artillery.

On 18 July 1944, U-479 damaged the Soviet submarine chaser MO-304 (later repaired).

On 28 July 1944, U-475 damaged the Soviet submarine chaser MO-107

a MO-4 type submarine chaser

On 30 July 1944, U-481 attacked a group of small Soviet minesweepers, sinking KT-804 and KT-807 while KT-806 was damaged. On the same day U-250 sunk the Soviet submarine chaser MO-105 but was then chased by other units until she was sunk by depth charges at low depth launched by MO-103. Six crew members of U-250, including the captain, were captured by the Soviets. Soviet divers worked to collect intelligence despite Axis attempts to prevent them, using mines, depth-charging the wreck and artillery shelling. Despite the German effort the Soviets succeeded in recovering the wreck. The Soviets acquired secret documents, an ENIGMA machine and the new acoustic G7es torpedo. The torpedo attracted the interest of the Royal Navy who failed to obtain one of the torpedoes from the Soviets.

On 31 July 1944, U-379 sunk the Soviet submarine chaser MO-101.

On 25 August 1944, U-242 sunk the Soviet survey vessel KKO-2 (600 tons) that was lost together the towed barge VRD-96 Del'fin (500 tons.

On 26 August 1944, U-745 sunk the Soviet auxiliary minesweeper T-45.

== Finland joins the Allies ==
After Finland joined the Allies, the Germans lost their base at Kotka and the Finnish Navy laid other mine fields under Soviet direction.

On 15 October 1944, U-481 sunk with gunfire the Finnish fishing boats Dan, Endla and Maria.

On 17 October 1944, U-1165 sunk the Soviet submarine chaser BMO-512. Soviets believed she was sunk by mine.

On 24 October 1944, U-958 sunk the Finnish fishing boat Linnea and damaged Piikkiö

On 28 October 1944, on a mine laid by U-242 was sunk the Finnish merchant Rigel (1495 GRT). She was the only proper merchant ship sunk by U-boats during this campaign.

On 29 October 1944, U-958 sunk the Soviet landing craft SB-2 (720 tons). The ship was carrying military equipment, supplies and guns and was heading to Saarenmaa for the Moonsund Landing Operation.

On 18 November 1944, U-679 sunk the Soviet patrol boat SK-62.

On 19 November 1944, U-481 sunk the Soviet barge 112600 (1000 tons)

On 27 November 1944, U-479 sunk on mines.

On 28 November 1944, U-481 sunk the Soviet coastal minesweeper T-387.

On 24 December 1944, U-637 sunk the Soviet submarine chaser BMO-594.

On 9 January 1945, U-679 sunk on mines.

On 11 January 1945, U-745 sunk the Soviet minesweeper T-76 (previously Lithuanian ship Presidentas Smetona)

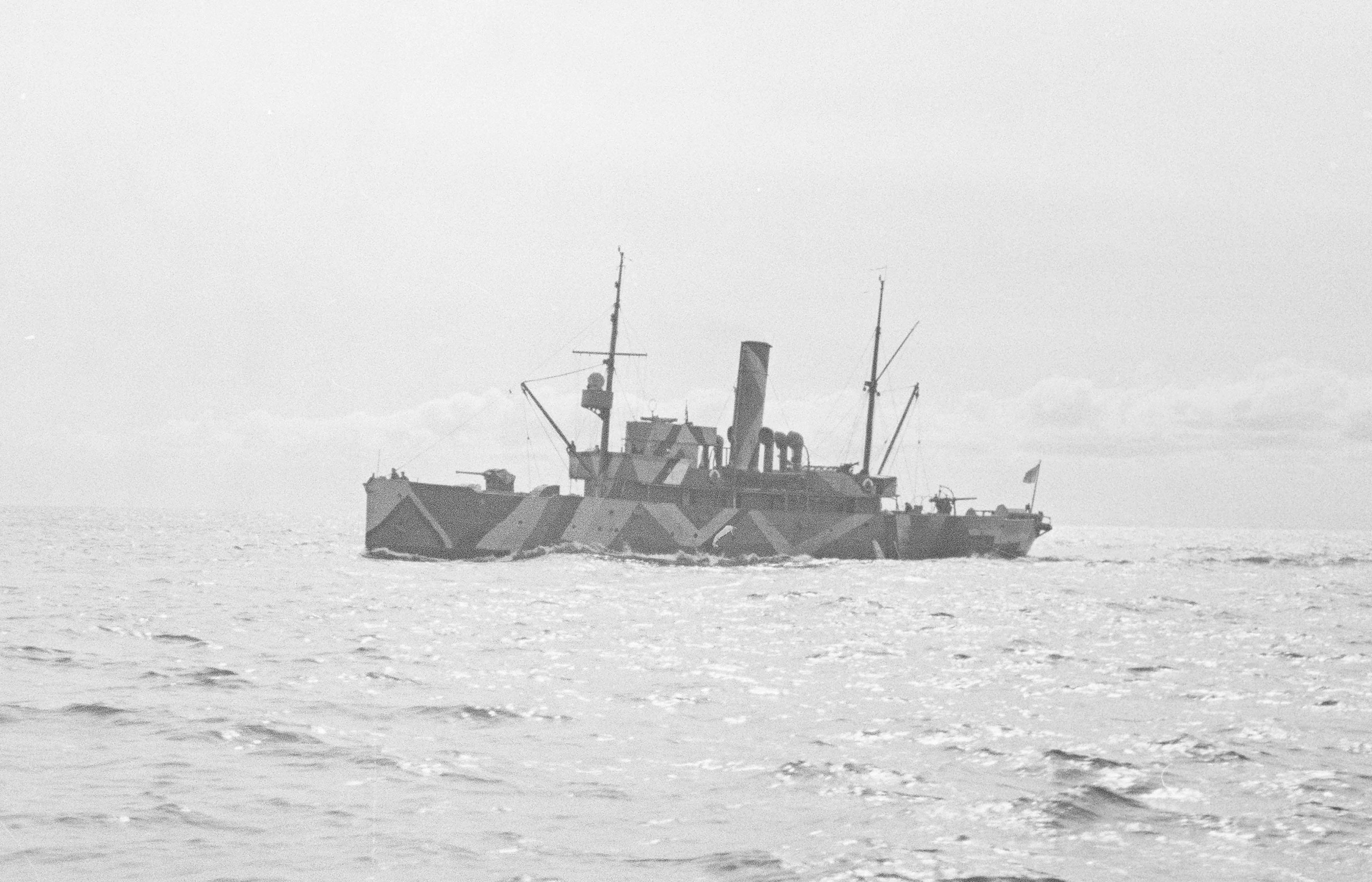
minelayer Louhi

On 12 January 1945, U-370 torpedoed and sunk Finnish minelayer Louhi. The Finnish ship had just laid the mine barrage "Vantaa-3" together Ruotsinsalmi and was under escort by two Soviet submarine chasers.

On 31 January 1945, U-745 sunk on mines from the barrage "Vantaa-3".

On 12 February 1945, U-676 sunk on mines from the barrage "Vantaa-3".

== Outcome ==
German submarines operated in difficult conditions, with large numbers of naval mines and light antisubmarine boats. Only a few targets, mostly small patrols, were sunk and no large merchant or significant target was found, at the cost of several U-boats lost. The only proper merchant ship sunk was the Finnish Rigel. The loss of U-250 was particularly important for the technology and intelligence obtained from it by the Soviets.

== See also ==
- Naval warfare in the Winter War, 1939 to 1940
- Baltic Sea campaigns (1939–45)
