= German submarine U-768 =

German World War II submarine

Coordinates: 54°30′N 19°15′E

History

Nazi Germany
- Name: U-768
- Ordered: 15 August 1940
- Builder: Kriegsmarinewerft Wilhelmshaven
- Yard number: 151
- Laid down: 5 April 1941
- Launched: 22 August 1943
- Commissioned: 14 October 1943
- Fate: Sunk in a collision with U-745 on 20 November 1943

General characteristics
- Class & type: Type VIIC submarine
- Displacement: 769 tonnes (757 long tons) surfaced; 871 t (857 long tons) submerged; 1,070 t (1,053 long tons) total
- Length: 67.10 m (220 ft 2 in) total; 50.50 m (165 ft 8 in) pressure hull
- Beam: 6.20 m (20 ft 4 in) total; 4.70 m (15 ft 5 in) pressure hull
- Draught: 4.74 m (15 ft 7 in)
- Propulsion: Diesel-electric; 3,200 PS (2,354 kW; 3,156 shp) surfaced; 750 PS (552 kW; 740 shp) submerged
- Speed: 17.7 knots (32.8 km/h; 20.4 mph) surfaced; 7.66 knots (14.19 km/h; 8.81 mph) submerged
- Range: 13,700 nmi (25,400 km; 15,800 mi) at 10 knots (19 km/h; 12 mph) surfaced; 125 nmi (232 km; 144 mi) at 4 knots (7.4 km/h; 4.6 mph) submerged
- Test depth: 220 m (721 ft 9 in)
- Complement: 4 officers, 40–56 enlisted44-52 men
- Armament: 5 × 53.3 cm (21 in) torpedo tubes (four bow, one stern); 14 × torpedoes; 1 × 3.7 cm (1.5 in) Flak M42 AA gun; 2 × twin 2 cm (0.79 in) C/30 anti-aircraft guns

Service record
- Part of: 31st U-boat Flotilla; 14 October – 20 November 1943
- Identification codes: M 53 733
- Commanders: Oblt.z.S. Johann Buttjer; 14 October – 20 November 1943
- Operations: None
- Victories: None

German submarine U-768 was a Type VIIC U-boat of Nazi Germany's Kriegsmarine during World War II.

Under the command of Oberleutnant zur See Johann Buttjer she was commissioned on 14 October 1943, and was sunk in a collision with U-745 on 20 November 1943.

== Design ==
German Type VIIC submarines were preceded by the shorter Type VIIB submarines. U-768 had a displacement of 769 tonnes (757 long tons) when at the surface and 871 tonnes (857 long tons) while submerged. She had a total length of 67.10 m (220 ft 2 in), a pressure hull length of 50.50 m (165 ft 8 in), a beam of 6.20 m (20 ft 4 in), a height of 9.60 m (31 ft 6 in), and a draught of 4.74 m (15 ft 7 in). The submarine was powered by two Germaniawerft F46 four-stroke, six-cylinder supercharged diesel engines producing a total of 2,800 to 3,200 metric horsepower (2,060 to 2,350 kW; 2,760 to 3,160 shp) for use while surfaced, two Garbe, Lahmeyer & Co. RP 137/c double-acting electric motors producing a total of 750 metric horsepower (550 kW; 740 shp) for use while submerged. She had two shafts and two 1.23 m (4 ft) propellers. The boat was capable of operating at depths of up to 230 metres (750 ft).

The submarine had a maximum surface speed of 17.7 knots (32.8 km/h; 20.4 mph) and a maximum submerged speed of 7.6 knots (14.1 km/h; 8.7 mph). When submerged, the boat could operate for 80 nautical miles (150 km; 92 mi) at 4 knots (7.4 km/h; 4.6 mph); when surfaced, she could travel 8,500 nautical miles (15,700 km; 9,800 mi) at 10 knots (19 km/h; 12 mph). U-768 was fitted with five 53.3 cm (21 in) torpedo tubes (four fitted at the bow and one at the stern), fourteen torpedoes, one 3.7 cm (1.5 in) Flak M42 and two twin 2 cm (0.79 in) C/30 anti-aircraft guns. The boat had a complement of between forty-four and sixty.

== Bibliography ==
- Busch, Rainer; Röll, Hans-Joachim (1999). German U-boat commanders of World War II : a biographical dictionary. Translated by Brooks, Geoffrey. London, Annapolis, Md: Greenhill Books, Naval Institute Press. ISBN 1-55750-186-6.
- Busch, Rainer; Röll, Hans-Joachim (1999). Der U-Boot-Krieg, 1939-1945: Deutsche U-Boot-Verluste von September 1939 bis Mai 1945 [German U-boat losses from September 1939 to May 1945] (in German). Vol. IV. Hamburg, Berlin, Bonn: Mittler. ISBN 3-8132-0514-2.
- Gröner, Eric; Jung, Dieter; Maass, Martin (1991). German Warships 1815-1945: U-boats and Mine Warfare Vessels. Vol. 2. Translated by Thomas, Keith; Magowan, Rachel. London: Conway Maritime Press. ISBN 0-85177-593-4.
