= Soviet cruiser Kirov =

Soviet Kirov-class light cruiser

Coordinates: 59.9420402°N 30.2086731°E

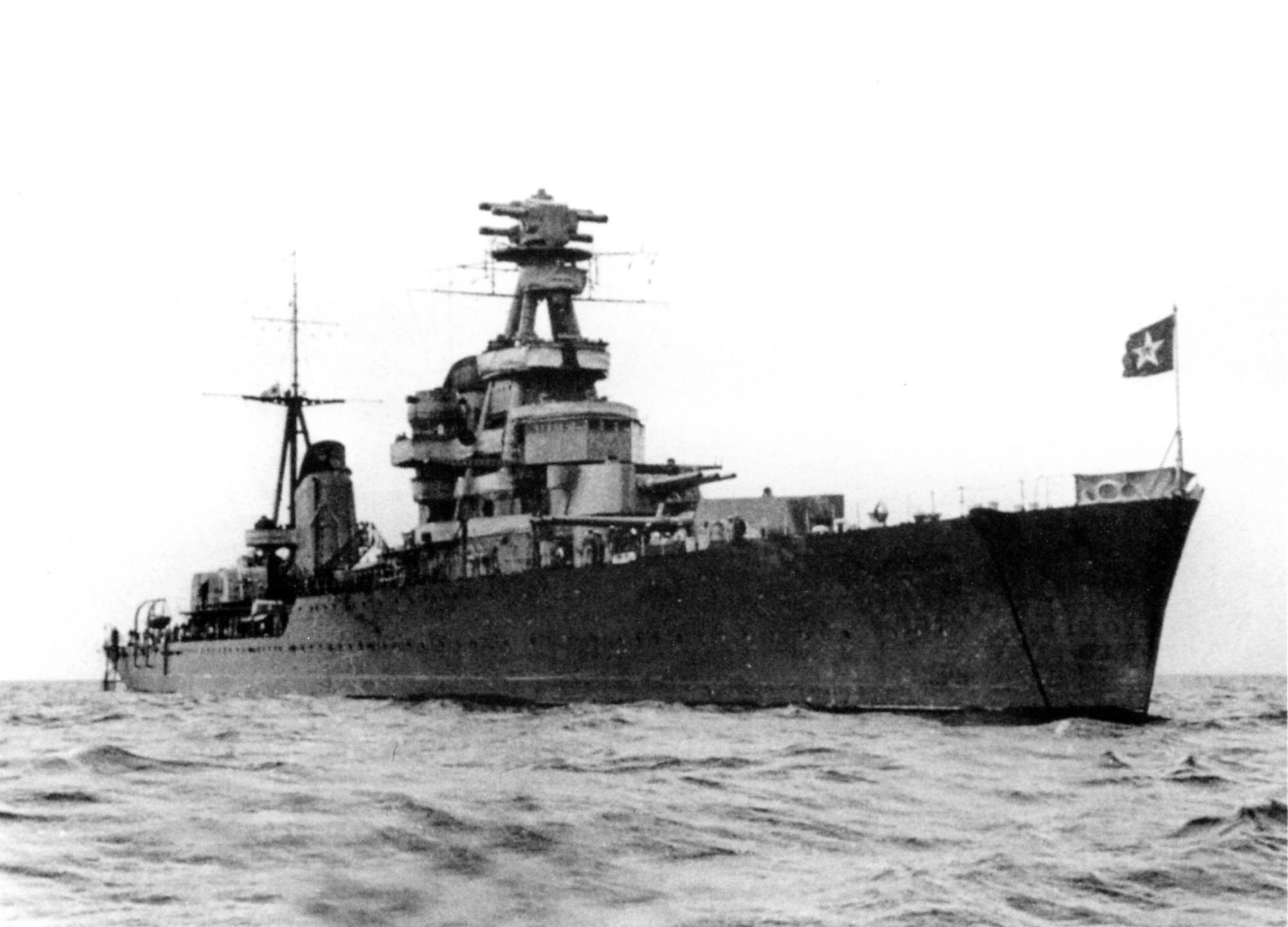
- Kirov in 1941

History

Soviet Union
- Name: Kirov
- Namesake: Sergei Kirov
- Builder: Ordzhonikidze Yard, Leningrad
- Yard number: 269
- Laid down: 22 October 1935
- Launched: 30 November 1936
- Commissioned: 23 September 1938
- Reclassified: As a training ship, 2 August 1961
- Stricken: December 1974
- Honours and awards: Order of the Red Banner
- Fate: Sold for scrap, 22 February 1974

General characteristics (Project 26)
- Class & type: Kirov-class cruiser
- Displacement: 7,890 t (7,765 long tons) (standard); 9,436 t (9,287 long tons) (full load)
- Length: 191.3 m (627 ft 7 in)
- Beam: 17.66 m (57 ft 11 in)
- Draught: 6.15 m (20 ft 2 in) (full load)
- Installed power: 6 Yarrow-Normand boilers; 113,500 shp (84,600 kW)
- Propulsion: 2 shafts; 2 geared steam turbines
- Speed: 35.94 knots (66.56 km/h; 41.36 mph) (on trials)
- Endurance: 3,750 nmi (6,940 km; 4,320 mi) at 18 knots (33 km/h; 21 mph)
- Complement: 872
- Sensors & processing systems: Arktur hydrophone
- Armament: 3 × triple 180 mm (7.1 in) guns; 6 × single 100 mm (3.9 in) dual-purpose guns; 6 × single 45 mm (1.8 in) AA guns; 4 × single 12.7 mm (0.50 in) AA machine guns; 2 × triple 533 mm (21 in) torpedo tubes; 96–164 mines; 50 depth charges
- Armor: Waterline belt: 50 mm (2.0 in); Deck: 50 mm (2.0 in) each; Turrets: 50 mm (2.0 in); Barbettes: 50 mm (2.0 in); Conning tower: 150 mm (5.9 in)
- Aircraft carried: 2 × KOR-1 seaplanes
- Aviation facilities: 1 Heinkel K-12 catapult

Kirov (Russian: Киров, IPA: [ˈkʲirəf]) was a Project 26 Kirov-class cruiser of the Soviet Navy that served during the Winter War and World War II, and into the Cold War. She attempted to bombard Finnish coast defense guns during action in the Winter War, but was driven off by a number of near misses that damaged her. She led the Evacuation of Tallinn at the end of August 1941, before being blockaded in Leningrad where she could only provide gunfire support during the siege of Leningrad. She bombarded Finnish positions during the Vyborg–Petrozavodsk Offensive in mid-1944, but played no further part in the war. Kirov was reclassified as a training cruiser on 2 August 1961 and sold for scrap on 22 February 1974.

== Description ==
Kirov was 191.3 metres (627 ft 7 in) long, had a beam of 17.66 metres (57 ft 11 in) and had a draft between 5.75 to 6.15 metres (18 ft 10 in to 20 ft 2 in). She displaced 7,890 tonnes (7,765 long tons) at standard load and 9,436 tonnes (9,287 long tons) at full load. Her steam turbines produced a total of 113,500 shaft horsepower (84,637 kW) and she reached 35.94 knots (66.56 km/h; 41.36 mph) on trials.

Kirov carried nine 180-millimeter (7.1 in) 57-caliber B-1-P guns in three electrically powered MK-3-180 triple turrets. Her secondary armament consisted of six single 100-millimeter (3.9 in) 56-caliber B-34 anti-aircraft guns fitted on each side of the rear funnel. Her light AA guns consisted of six semi-automatic 45-millimeter (1.8 in) 21-K AA guns and four DK 12.7-millimeter (0.50 in) machine guns. Six 533-millimeter (21.0 in) 39-Yu torpedo tubes were fitted in two triple mountings.

=== Wartime modifications ===
By 1944 Kirov exchanged her 45 mm (1.8 in) guns for ten fully automatic 37-millimeter (1.5 in) 70-K AA guns with a thousand rounds per gun, two extra DK machine guns and one Lend-Lease quadruple Vickers .50 machine gun MK III mount.

Kirov lacked any radar when war broke out in 1941, but by 1944 was equipped with British Lend-Lease models. One Type 291 was used for air search. One Type 284 and two Type 285 radars were for main battery fire control, while anti-aircraft fire control was provided by two Type 282 radars.

=== Post-war refit ===
Kirov was completely overhauled from 1949 to 1953. Her secondary armament was upgraded with electrically powered, fully automated 100 mm B-34USM mountings and her fire-control system was replaced with a Zenit-26 system with SPN-500 stabilized directors. All of her light AA guns were replaced with nine twin gun water-cooled 37 mm V-11 mounts. All of her radars were replaced with Soviet systems: Rif surface search, Gyuys air search, Zalp surface gunnery and Yakor' anti-aircraft gunnery radars. All anti-submarine weapons, torpedo launchers, aircraft equipment and boat cranes were removed. While expensive, about half the cost of a new Project 68bis Sverdlov-class cruiser, it was deemed a success and allowed Kirov to serve for another two decades.

== Service ==
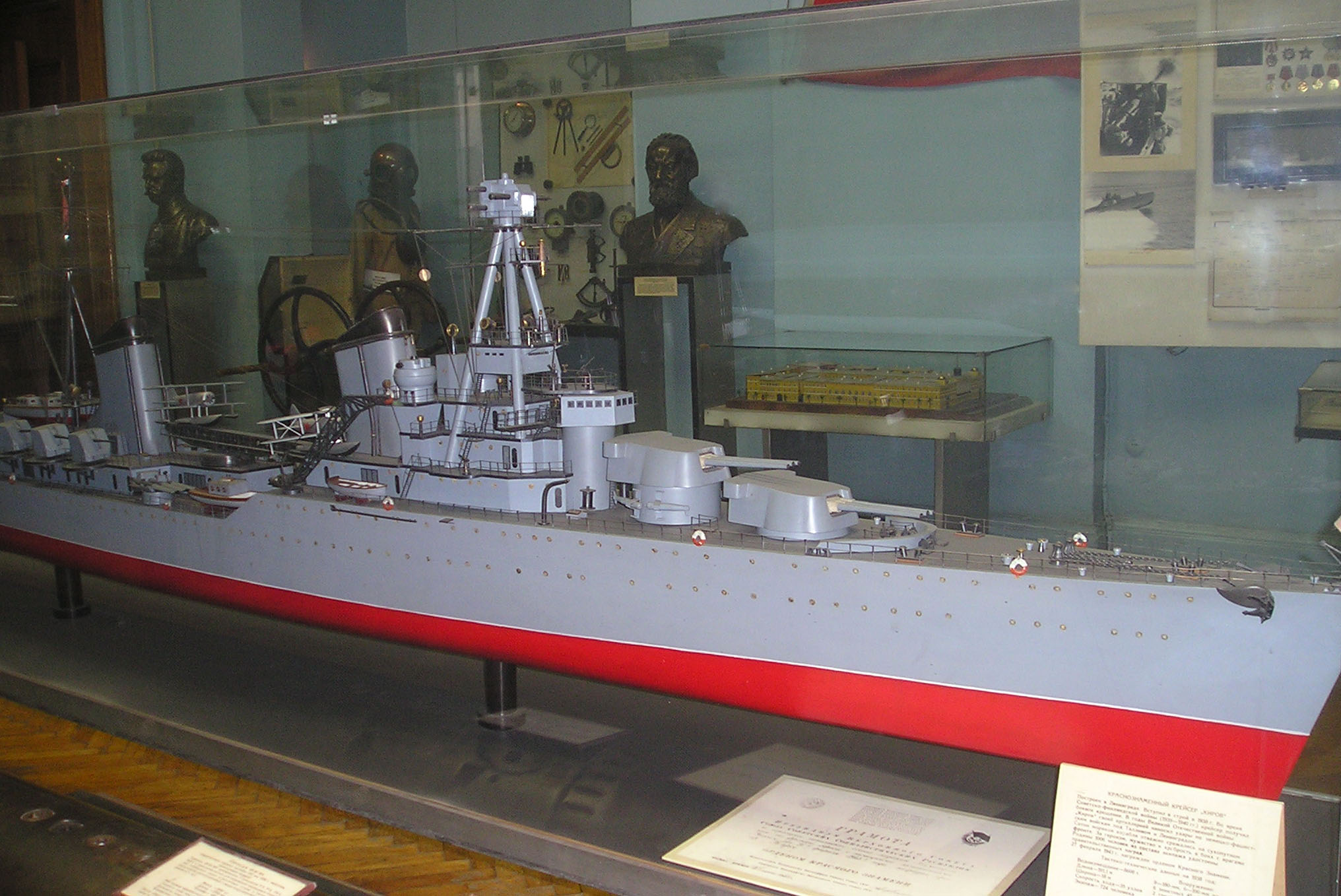
A model of Kirov displayed in the Central Naval Museum in Saint Petersburg

Kirov was laid down at the Ordzhonikidze Yard, Leningrad on 22 October 1935. She was launched on 30 November 1936 and was completed on 26 September 1938. She was commissioned into the Baltic Fleet in the autumn of 1938, but was still being worked on into early 1939. Kirov sailed to Riga on 22 October when the Soviet Union began to occupy Latvia, continuing on to Liepāja the following day.

=== World War II ===
During the Winter War, Kirov, escorted by the destroyers Smetlivyi and Stremitel'nyi, attempted to bombard Finnish coast defense guns at Russarö, 5 kilometres (3.1 mi) south of Hanko on 30 November. She only fired 35 rounds before she was damaged by a number of near misses and had to return to the Soviet naval base at Liepāja for repairs. She remained there for the rest of the Winter War and afterwards was under repair at Kronstadt from October 1940 to 21 May 1941.

Based near Riga at the time of the German attack on the Soviet Union in June 1941, Kirov was trapped in the Gulf of Riga by the rapid enemy advance. She supported minelaying sorties by Soviet destroyers in the western half of the Irben Strait on the evenings of 24–25 and 26–27 June. Off-loading her fuel and ammunition to reduce her draft, she passed through the shallow Moon Sound Channel (between Muhu island and the Estonian mainland) with great difficulty, and managed to reach Tallinn by the end of June. Kirov provided gunfire support during the defense of Tallinn and served as the flagship of the evacuation fleet from Tallinn to Leningrad at the end of August 1941. For most of the rest of the war she was blockaded in Leningrad and Kronstadt by Axis minefields and could only provide gunfire support for the defenders during the siege of Leningrad. She was damaged by a number of German air and artillery attacks, most seriously on 4–5 April 1942 when she was hit by three bombs and one 15-centimeter (5.9 in) shell that damaged all six 100 mm AA guns, the aft funnel, the mainmast, and killed 86 sailors and wounded 46. Repairs took two months during which her catapult was removed; a lighter pole mainmast was fitted and her anti-aircraft armament increased. After Leningrad was liberated in early 1944, Kirov remained there, and took no further part in the war except to provide gunfire support for the Soviet Vyborg–Petrozavodsk Offensive in mid–1944.

=== Post-war ===
Kirov was damaged by a German magnetic mine while leaving Kronstadt on 17 October 1945 and was under repair until 20 December 1946. She was refitted from November 1949 to April 1953, during which her machinery was completely overhauled and her radars, fire control systems and anti-aircraft guns were replaced by the latest Soviet systems. She participated in fleet maneuvers in the North Sea during January 1956. She was reclassified as a training cruiser, regularly visiting Poland and East Germany, on 2 August 1961 and sold for scrap on 22 February 1974. When Kirov was decommissioned, two gun turrets were installed in Saint Petersburg as a monument.

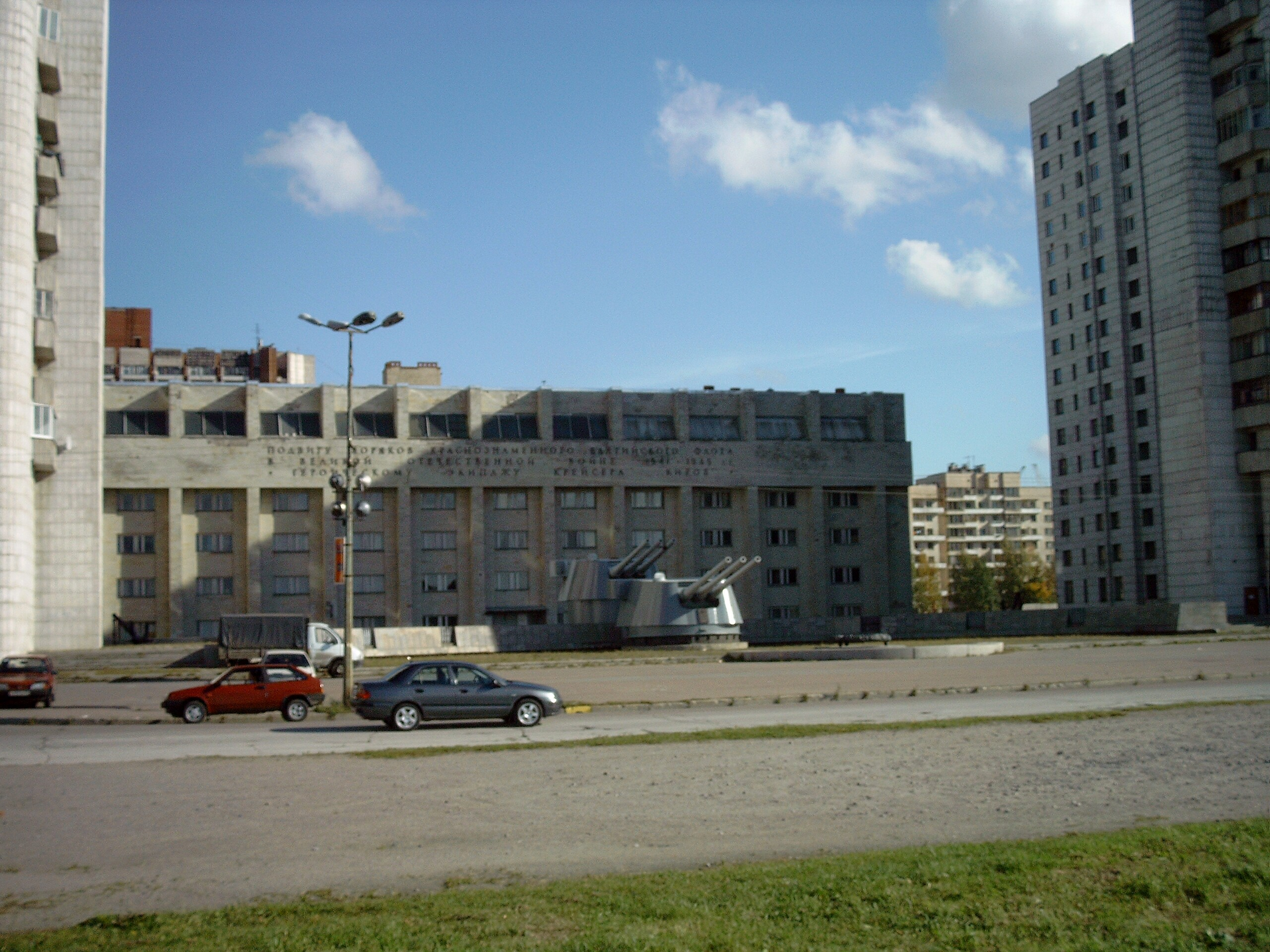
Kirov memorial and environment

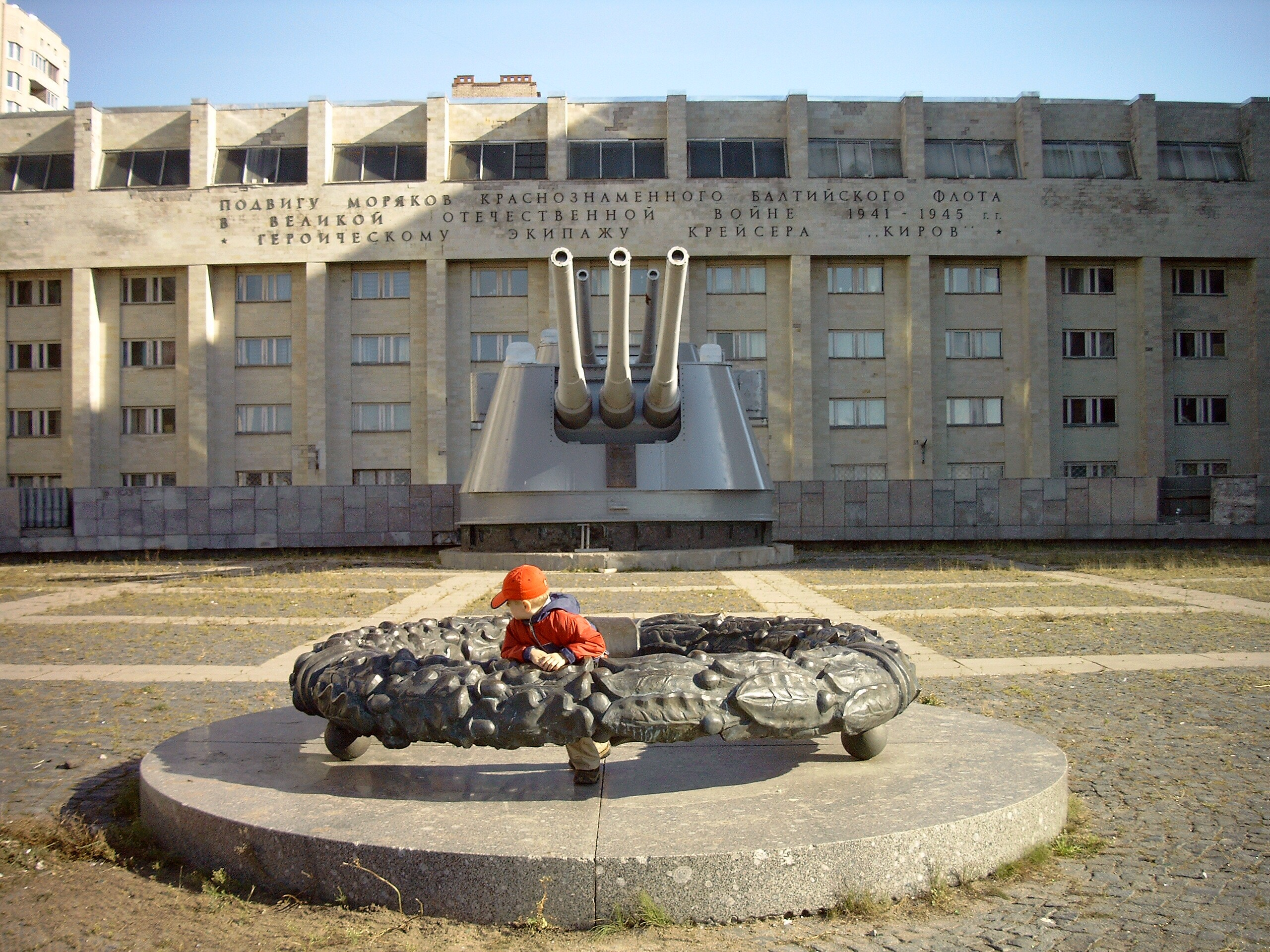
Kirov memorial

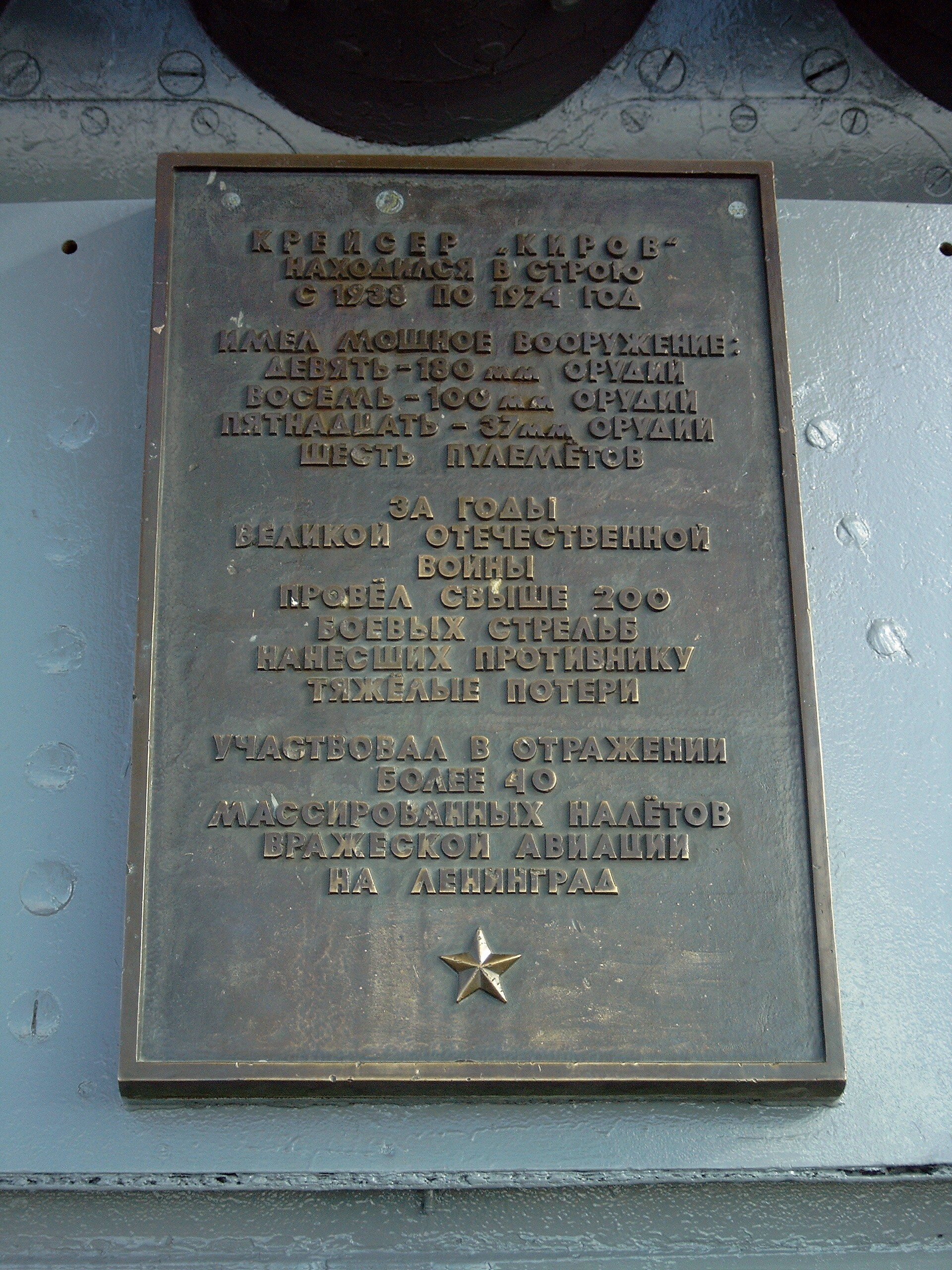
Kirov memorial plaque

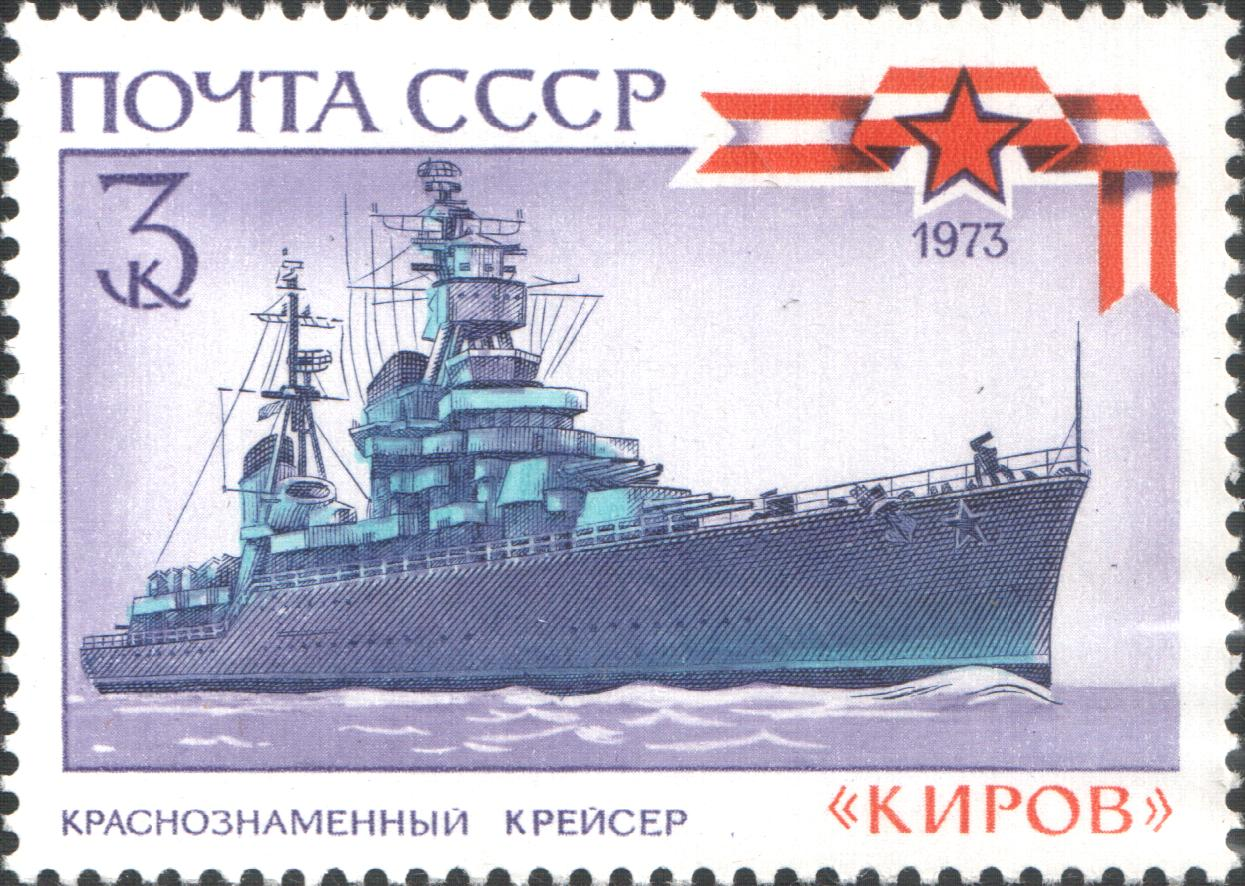
1973 Soviet stamp featuring Kirov
