= German submarine U-745 =

German World War II submarine

Coordinates: 59°30′N 23°00′E

History

Nazi Germany
- Name: U-745
- Ordered: 5 June 1941
- Builder: Schichau-Werke, Danzig
- Yard number: 1548
- Laid down: 8 July 1942
- Launched: 16 April 1943
- Commissioned: 19 June 1943
- Fate: Sunk on 31 January 1945

General characteristics
- Class & type: Type VIIC submarine
- Displacement: 769 tonnes (757 long tons) surfaced; 871 t (857 long tons) submerged
- Length: 67.10 m (220 ft 2 in) o/a; 50.50 m (165 ft 8 in) pressure hull
- Beam: 6.20 m (20 ft 4 in) o/a; 4.70 m (15 ft 5 in) pressure hull
- Height: 9.60 m (31 ft 6 in)
- Draught: 4.74 m (15 ft 7 in)
- Installed power: 2,800–3,200 PS (2,100–2,400 kW; 2,800–3,200 bhp) (diesels); 750 PS (550 kW; 740 shp) (electric)
- Propulsion: 2 shafts; 2 × diesel engines; 2 × electric motors
- Speed: 17.7 knots (32.8 km/h; 20.4 mph) surfaced; 7.6 knots (14.1 km/h; 8.7 mph) submerged
- Range: 8,500 nmi (15,700 km; 9,800 mi) at 10 knots (19 km/h; 12 mph) surfaced; 80 nmi (150 km; 92 mi) at 4 knots (7.4 km/h; 4.6 mph) submerged
- Test depth: 230 m (750 ft); Crush depth: 250–295 m (820–968 ft)
- Complement: 4 officers, 40–56 enlisted
- Armament: 5 × 53.3 cm (21 in) torpedo tubes (four bow, one stern); 14 × torpedoes; 1 × 8.8 cm (3.46 in) deck gun (220 rounds); 1 × twin 2 cm (0.79 in) C/30 anti-aircraft gun

Service record
- Part of: 8th U-boat Flotilla; 19 June 1943 – 31 January 1945
- Identification codes: M 52 636
- Commanders: Oblt.z.S. / Kptlt. Wilhelm von Trotha; 19 June 1943 – 31 January 1945
- Operations: 4 patrols: 1st patrol: a. 9 June – 7 July 1944; b. 15 – 17 Jul 1944; c. 29 July – 1 August 1944; d. 3 – 7 August 1944; e. 8 – 9 August 1944; f. 14 – 18 August 1944; g. 20 August 1944; 2nd patrol: a. 23 – 27 August 1944; b. 29 August 1944; 3rd patrol: 11 September – 20 October 1944; 4th patrol: 23 December 1944 – 31 January 1945
- Victories: 1 warship sunk (600 tons); 1 auxiliary warship sunk (140 GRT)

German submarine U-745 was a Type VIIC U-boat built for Nazi Germany's Kriegsmarine for service during World War II, and which was lost at sea on 31 January 1945.

U-745 was launched on 16 April 1943, under the command of Oberleutnant zur See Wilhelm von Trotha, who would remain its commanding officer for its entire service. U-745 had a crew of 45.

== Design ==
German Type VIIC submarines were preceded by the shorter Type VIIB submarines. U-745 had a displacement of 769 tonnes (757 long tons) when at the surface and 871 tonnes (857 long tons) while submerged. She had a total length of 67.10 m (220 ft 2 in), a pressure hull length of 50.50 m (165 ft 8 in), a beam of 6.20 m (20 ft 4 in), a height of 9.60 m (31 ft 6 in), and a draught of 4.74 m (15 ft 7 in). The submarine was powered by two Germaniawerft F46 four-stroke, six-cylinder supercharged diesel engines producing a total of 2,800 to 3,200 metric horsepower (2,060 to 2,350 kW; 2,760 to 3,160 shp) for use while surfaced, two AEG GU 460/8–27 double-acting electric motors producing a total of 750 metric horsepower (550 kW; 740 shp) for use while submerged. She had two shafts and two 1.23 m (4 ft) propellers. The boat was capable of operating at depths of up to 230 metres (750 ft).

The submarine had a maximum surface speed of 17.7 knots (32.8 km/h; 20.4 mph) and a maximum submerged speed of 7.6 knots (14.1 km/h; 8.7 mph). When submerged, the boat could operate for 80 nautical miles (150 km; 92 mi) at 4 knots (7.4 km/h; 4.6 mph); when surfaced, she could travel 8,500 nautical miles (15,700 km; 9,800 mi) at 10 knots (19 km/h; 12 mph). U-745 was fitted with five 53.3 cm (21 in) torpedo tubes (four fitted at the bow and one at the stern), fourteen torpedoes, one 8.8 cm (3.46 in) SK C/35 naval gun, 220 rounds, and one twin 2 cm (0.79 in) C/30 anti-aircraft gun. The boat had a complement of between forty-four and sixty.

== Service history ==
She undertook four patrols during her service, and sank one allied auxiliary ship, the Soviet minesweeping trawler T-45 Antikajnen (No. 48), and one allied warship, the Soviet fleet minesweeper T-76 Korall.

=== Fate ===
On 31 January 1945, she was lost with all hands in the Gulf of Finland by a mine laid by the Finnish minelayers Louhi and Ruotsinsalmi on 12 January 1945.

Wilhelm von Trotha's body was found a month later near Föglö, Finland, and buried three days later. No other bodies were recovered. Unlike most U-boats, which suffered casualties during the course of service due to accidents or other causes, U-745 suffered no casualties at all, until the time of her disappearance.

In late 2012 the Finnish diving team 'Badewanne', after 10 years of searching, reported they had found both U-676 and U-745 in the Gulf of Finland south of Hanko.

== Summary of raiding history ==
Date	Ship Name	Nationality	Tonnage (Note: Merchant ship tonnages are in gross register tons. Military vessels are listed by tons displacement.)	Fate
26 August 1944	T-45 Antikajnen (No. 48)	Soviet Navy	140	Sunk
11 January 1945	T-76 Korall	Soviet Navy	600	Sunk

== Bibliography ==
- Busch, Rainer; Röll, Hans-Joachim (1999). German U-boat commanders of World War II : a biographical dictionary. Translated by Brooks, Geoffrey. London, Annapolis, Md: Greenhill Books, Naval Institute Press. ISBN 1-55750-186-6.
- Busch, Rainer; Röll, Hans-Joachim (1999). Der U-Boot-Krieg, 1939-1945: Deutsche U-Boot-Verluste von September 1939 bis Mai 1945 [German U-boat losses from September 1939 to May 1945] (in German). Vol. IV. Hamburg, Berlin, Bonn: Mittler. ISBN 3-8132-0514-2.
- Gröner, Eric; Jung, Dieter; Maass, Martin (1991). German Warships 1815-1945: U-boats and Mine Warfare Vessels. Vol. 2. Translated by Thomas, Keith; Magowan, Rachel. London: Conway Maritime Press. ISBN 0-85177-593-4.
