= German submarine U-679 =

German World War II submarine

History

Nazi Germany
- Name: U-679
- Ordered: 5 June 1941
- Builder: Howaldtswerke, Hamburg
- Yard number: 828
- Laid down: 3 September 1942
- Launched: 18 September 1943
- Commissioned: 29 November 1943
- Fate: Sunk on 9 January 1945

General characteristics
- Class & type: Type VIIC submarine
- Displacement: 769 tonnes (757 long tons) surfaced; 871 t (857 long tons) submerged
- Length: 67.10 m (220 ft 2 in) o/a; 50.50 m (165 ft 8 in) pressure hull
- Beam: 6.20 m (20 ft 4 in) o/a; 4.70 m (15 ft 5 in) pressure hull
- Draught: 4.74 m (15 ft 7 in)
- Installed power: 2,800–3,200 PS (2,100–2,400 kW; 2,800–3,200 bhp) (diesels); 750 PS (550 kW; 740 shp) (electric)
- Propulsion: 2 shafts; 2 × diesel engines; 2 × electric motors
- Speed: 17.7 knots (32.8 km/h; 20.4 mph) surfaced; 7.6 knots (14.1 km/h; 8.7 mph) submerged
- Range: 8,500 nmi (15,700 km; 9,800 mi) at 10 knots (19 km/h; 12 mph) surfaced; 80 nmi (150 km; 92 mi) at 4 knots (7.4 km/h; 4.6 mph) submerged
- Test depth: 230 m (750 ft); Crush depth: 250–295 m (820–968 ft)
- Complement: 4 officers, 40–56 enlisted
- Armament: 5 × 53.3 cm (21 in) torpedo tubes (4 bow, 1 stern); 14 × torpedoes; 1 × 3.7 cm (1.5 in) Flak M42 AA gun; 2 × twin 2 cm (0.79 in) C/30 anti-aircraft guns

Service record
- Part of: 31st U-boat Flotilla; 29 November 1943 – 31 July 1944; 8th U-boat Flotilla; 1 August 1944 – 9 January 1945
- Identification codes: M 53 677
- Commanders: Lt.z.S. / Oblt.z.S. Friedrich Breckwoldt; 29 November 1943 – 20 October 1944; Oblt.z.S. Eduard Aust; 21 October 1944 – 9 January 1945
- Operations: 3 patrols: 1st patrol: 11 – 16 July 1944; 2nd patrol: 18 July – 10 September 1944; 3rd patrol: 2 November 1944 – 9 January 1945
- Victories: 1 warship sunk (39 tons); 1 warship damaged (36 tons)

German submarine U-679 was a Type VIIC U-boat built for Nazi Germany's Kriegsmarine for service during World War II. She was laid down on 3 September 1942 by Howaldtswerke-Deutsche Werft, Hamburg as yard number 828, launched on 18 September 1943 and commissioned on 29 November 1943 under Leutnant zur See Friedrich Breckwoldt.

== Design ==
German Type VIIC submarines were preceded by the shorter Type VIIB submarines. U-679 had a displacement of 769 tonnes (757 long tons) when at the surface and 871 tonnes (857 long tons) while submerged. She had a total length of 67.10 m (220 ft 2 in), a pressure hull length of 50.50 m (165 ft 8 in), a beam of 6.20 m (20 ft 4 in), a height of 9.60 m (31 ft 6 in), and a draught of 4.74 m (15 ft 7 in). The submarine was powered by two Germaniawerft F46 four-stroke, six-cylinder supercharged diesel engines producing a total of 2,800 to 3,200 metric horsepower (2,060 to 2,350 kW; 2,760 to 3,160 shp) for use while surfaced, two Siemens-Schuckert GU 343/38-8 double-acting electric motors producing a total of 750 metric horsepower (550 kW; 740 shp) for use while submerged. She had two shafts and two 1.23 m (4 ft) propellers. The boat was capable of operating at depths of up to 230 metres (750 ft).

The submarine had a maximum surface speed of 17.7 knots (32.8 km/h; 20.4 mph) and a maximum submerged speed of 7.6 knots (14.1 km/h; 8.7 mph). When submerged, the boat could operate for 80 nautical miles (150 km; 92 mi) at 4 knots (7.4 km/h; 4.6 mph); when surfaced, she could travel 8,500 nautical miles (15,700 km; 9,800 mi) at 10 knots (19 km/h; 12 mph). U-679 was fitted with five 53.3 cm (21 in) torpedo tubes (four fitted at the bow and one at the stern), fourteen torpedoes, one 3.7 cm (1.5 in) Flak M42 and two twin 2 cm (0.79 in) C/30 anti-aircraft guns. The boat had a complement of between forty-four and sixty.

== Service history ==
The boat's career began with training at 31st Flotilla on 29 November 1943, followed by active service on 1 August 1944 as part of the 8th Flotilla. U-679 took part in no wolfpacks. U-679 was presumed sunk on 9 January 1945 in the Baltic Sea at 59°26′N 24°07′E by depth charges from Soviet anti-submarine vessel MO-124. However, the wreckage was located in August 2015 and initial reports suggest that actually U-679 had run into a mine and sank after that. Wreckage lies at depth of 90 metres at a location, which is somewhat different from the information given earlier.

== Summary of raiding history ==
Date	Ship Name	Nationality	Tonnage (Note: Merchant ship tonnages are in gross register tons. Military vessels are listed by tons displacement.)	Fate
15 July 1944	TK-57	Soviet Navy	36	Damaged
18 November 1944	SK-62	Soviet Navy	39	Sunk

== Bibliography ==
- Busch, Rainer; Röll, Hans-Joachim (1999). German U-boat commanders of World War II : a biographical dictionary. Translated by Brooks, Geoffrey. London, Annapolis, Md: Greenhill Books, Naval Institute Press. ISBN 1-55750-186-6.
- Gröner, Eric; Jung, Dieter; Maass, Martin (1991). German Warships 1815-1945: U-boats and Mine Warfare Vessels. Vol. 2. Translated by Thomas, Keith; Magowan, Rachel. London: Conway Maritime Press. ISBN 0-85177-593-4.
- Kemp, Paul (1997). U-Boats Destroyed – German Submarine Losses in the World Wars. Arms and Armour Press. p. 228. ISBN 1-85409-321-5.
- Sharpe, Peter (1998). U-Boat Fact File. Great Britain: Midland Publishing. ISBN 1-85780-072-9.
