= German submarine U-479 =

German World War II submarine

History

Nazi Germany
- Name: U-479
- Ordered: 10 April 1941
- Builder: Deutsche Werke AG, Kiel
- Yard number: 310
- Laid down: 19 November 1942
- Launched: 14 August 1943
- Commissioned: 27 October 1943
- Fate: Sunk by mine in the Gulf of Finland on 27 November 1944.

General characteristics
- Class & type: Type VIIC submarine
- Displacement: 769 tonnes (757 long tons) surfaced; 871 t (857 long tons) submerged
- Length: 67.23 m (220 ft 7 in) o/a; 50.50 m (165 ft 8 in) pressure hull
- Beam: 6.20 m (20 ft 4 in) o/a; 4.70 m (15 ft 5 in) pressure hull
- Height: 9.60 m (31 ft 6 in)
- Draught: 4.74 m (15 ft 7 in)
- Installed power: 2,800–3,200 PS (2,100–2,400 kW; 2,800–3,200 bhp) (diesels); 750 PS (550 kW; 740 shp) (electric)
- Propulsion: 2 shafts; 2 × diesel engines; 2 × electric motors
- Speed: 17.7 knots (32.8 km/h; 20.4 mph) surfaced; 7.6 knots (14.1 km/h; 8.7 mph) submerged
- Range: 8,500 nmi (15,700 km; 9,800 mi) at 10 knots (19 km/h; 12 mph) surfaced; 80 nmi (150 km; 92 mi) at 4 knots (7.4 km/h; 4.6 mph) submerged
- Test depth: 230 m (750 ft); Crush depth: 250–295 m (820–968 ft)
- Complement: 4 officers, 40–56 enlisted
- Armament: 5 × 53.3 cm (21 in) torpedo tubes (four bow, one stern); 14 × torpedoes or 26 TMA mines; 1 × 8.8 cm (3.46 in) deck gun (220 rounds); 1 × 3.7 cm (1.5 in) Flak M42 AA gun; 2 × twin 2 cm (0.79 in) C/30 anti-aircraft guns

Service record
- Part of: 5th U-boat Flotilla; 27 October 1943 – 31 July 1944; 8th U-boat Flotilla; 1 August – 27 November 1944
- Identification codes: M 53 594
- Commanders: Oblt.z.S. Hans-Joachim Förster; August 1943; Oblt.z.S. Friedrich-Wilhelm Sons; 27 October 1943 – 27 November 1944
- Operations: 5 patrols: 1st patrol: a. 13 – 25 July 1944; b. 27 July – 1 August 1944; 2nd patrol: 3 – 11 August 1944; 3rd patrol: 16 – 25 August 1944; 4th patrol: 30 August – 23 September 1944; 5th patrol: 27 October – 27 November 1944
- Victories: 1 warship damaged (56 tons)

German submarine U-479 was a Type VIIC U-boat built for Nazi Germany's Kriegsmarine for service during World War II. She was laid down at the Deutsche Werke in Kiel on 19 November 1942 as yard number 310, launched on 14 August 1943 and was commissioned on 27 October 1943 with Oberleutnant zur See Hans-Joachim Förster, a Knights Cross winner, in command. He was replaced shortly afterwards by Oberleutnant Friedrich-Wilhelm Sons.

== Design ==
German Type VIIC submarines were preceded by the shorter Type VIIB submarines. U-479 had a displacement of 769 tonnes (757 long tons) when at the surface and 871 tonnes (857 long tons) while submerged. She had a total length of 67.10 m (220 ft 2 in), a pressure hull length of 50.50 m (165 ft 8 in), a beam of 6.20 m (20 ft 4 in), a height of 9.60 m (31 ft 6 in), and a draught of 4.74 m (15 ft 7 in). The submarine was powered by two Germaniawerft F46 four-stroke, six-cylinder supercharged diesel engines producing a total of 2,800 to 3,200 metric horsepower (2,060 to 2,350 kW; 2,760 to 3,160 shp) for use while surfaced, two Siemens-Schuckert GU 343/38–8 double-acting electric motors producing a total of 750 metric horsepower (550 kW; 740 shp) for use while submerged. She had two shafts and two 1.23 m (4 ft) propellers. The boat was capable of operating at depths of up to 230 metres (750 ft).

The submarine had a maximum surface speed of 17.7 knots (32.8 km/h; 20.4 mph) and a maximum submerged speed of 7.6 knots (14.1 km/h; 8.7 mph). When submerged, the boat could operate for 80 nautical miles (150 km; 92 mi) at 4 knots (7.4 km/h; 4.6 mph); when surfaced, she could travel 8,500 nautical miles (15,700 km; 9,800 mi) at 10 knots (19 km/h; 12 mph). U-479 was fitted with five 53.3 cm (21 in) torpedo tubes (four fitted at the bow and one at the stern), fourteen torpedoes, one 8.8 cm (3.46 in) SK C/35 naval gun, (220 rounds), one 3.7 cm (1.5 in) Flak M42 and two twin 2 cm (0.79 in) C/30 anti-aircraft guns. The boat had a complement of between forty-four and sixty.

== Service history ==
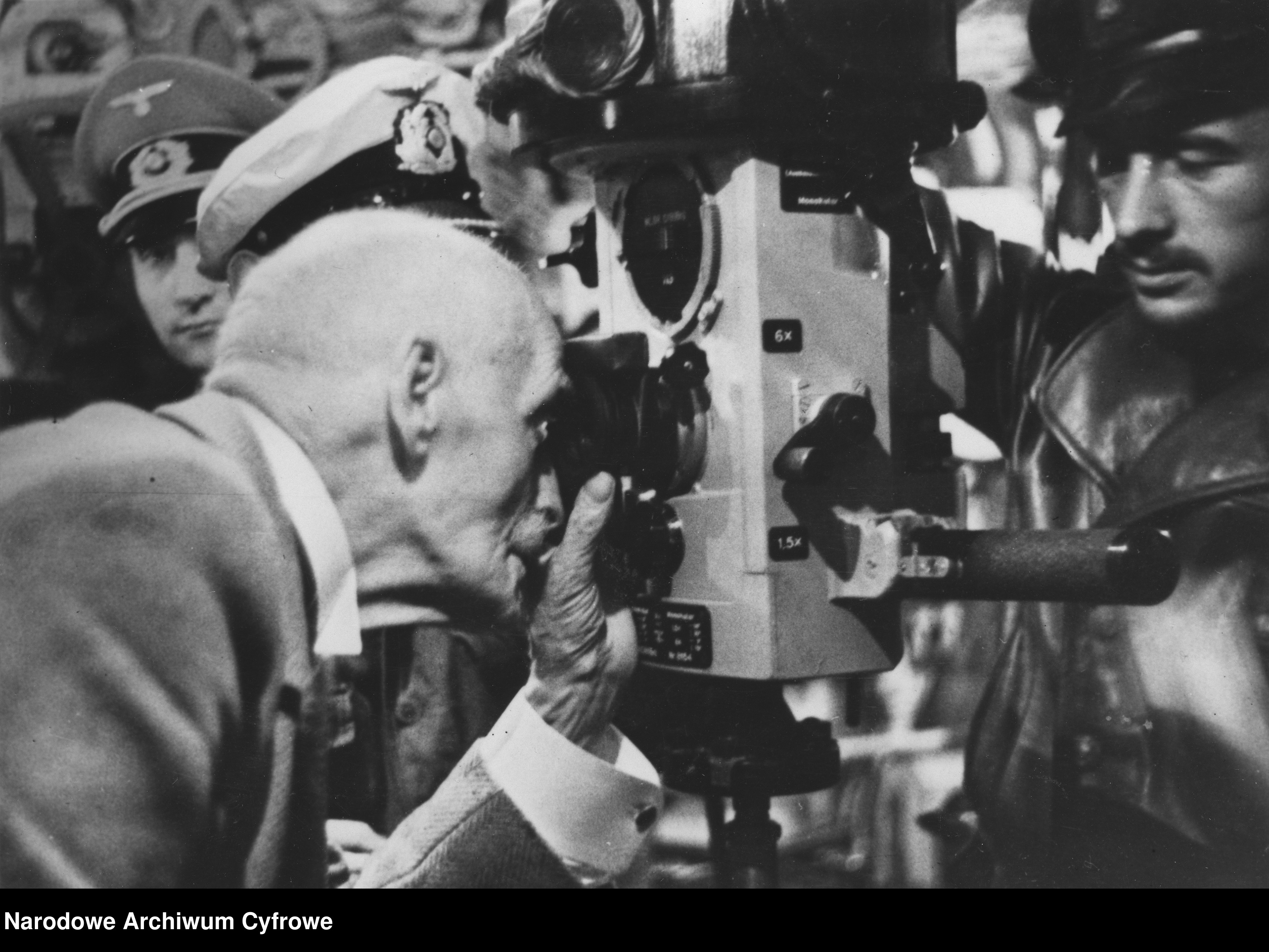
The 84-year-old, Nazi-friendly Norwegian author Knut Hamsun, who received the Nobel Prize in Literature in 1920, peers through the periscope aboard the U-479 submarine in Arendal, Norway, during a propaganda visit in June 1944.

The boat began her service career as part of the 5th U-boat Flotilla for training, before moving to the 8th flotilla for operations. She sank no ships during her career, but on 18 July 1944 U-479 torpedoed and damaged the Soviet submarine-chaser MO-304 in Vyborg bay.

The U-boat's first patrol was preceded by short voyages from Kiel to Arendal (on the southern Norwegian coast near Kristiansand), back to Kiel and then on to Helsinki in Finland.

=== First patrol ===
Her first foray proper saw her depart Helsinki on 13 July 1944, arrive at Esplanade (on the southern Finnish coast) on 25 July and move back to Helsinki on 1 August.

=== Second and third patrols ===
Her second and third sorties were both launched from Helsinki in August and were uneventful.

=== Fourth patrol ===
The submarine's fourth patrol was only different from her second and third efforts in that it terminated at Danzig, (now Gdansk).

=== Loss ===
The U-boat was sunk by a Soviet naval mine in the Gulf of Finland on 27 November 1944. She was found in 2009, explored in the summer of 2014 and 2018, sonar surveys by Estonian vessel VLT-089 on July 24, 2018; and filmed on 8–9 September 2018 by Finnish vessel Deep Explorer and on October 10, 2018, by Estonian vessel VLT-089 in position 59°20′N 23°10′E in Estonian waters.

== Summary of raiding history ==
Date	Ship Name	Nationality	Tonnage (Note: Merchant ship tonnages are in gross register tons. Military vessels are listed by tons displacement.)	Fate
18 July 1944	MO-304	Soviet Navy	56	Damaged

== Bibliography ==
- Busch, Rainer; Röll, Hans-Joachim (1999). German U-boat commanders of World War II : a biographical dictionary. Translated by Brooks, Geoffrey. London, Annapolis, Md: Greenhill Books, Naval Institute Press. ISBN 1-55750-186-6.
- Busch, Rainer; Röll, Hans-Joachim (1999). Deutsche U-Boot-Verluste von September 1939 bis Mai 1945 [German U-boat losses from September 1939 to May 1945]. Der U-Boot-Krieg (in German). Vol. IV. Hamburg, Berlin, Bonn: Mittler. ISBN 3-8132-0514-2.
- Gröner, Erich; Jung, Dieter; Maass, Martin (1991). U-boats and Mine Warfare Vessels. German Warships 1815–1945. Vol. 2. Translated by Thomas, Keith; Magowan, Rachel. London: Conway Maritime Press. ISBN 0-85177-593-4.
