= German submarine U-242 =

German World War II submarine

Coordinates: 52°02′09″N 5°46′08″W

History

Nazi Germany
- Name: U-242
- Ordered: 10 April 1941
- Builder: Germaniawerft, Kiel
- Yard number: 676
- Laid down: 30 September 1942
- Launched: 20 July 1943
- Commissioned: 14 August 1943
- Fate: Sunk by a mine on 5 April 1945

General characteristics
- Class & type: Type VIIC submarine
- Displacement: 769 tonnes (757 long tons) surfaced; 871 t (857 long tons) submerged
- Length: 67.10 m (220 ft 2 in) o/a; 50.50 m (165 ft 8 in) pressure hull
- Beam: 6.20 m (20 ft 4 in) o/a; 4.70 m (15 ft 5 in) pressure hull
- Height: 9.60 m (31 ft 6 in)
- Draught: 4.74 m (15 ft 7 in)
- Installed power: 2,800–3,200 PS (2,100–2,400 kW; 2,800–3,200 bhp) (diesels); 750 PS (550 kW; 740 shp) (electric)
- Propulsion: 2 shafts; 2 × diesel engines; 2 × electric motors
- Speed: 17.7 knots (32.8 km/h; 20.4 mph) surfaced; 7.6 knots (14.1 km/h; 8.7 mph) submerged
- Range: 8,500 nmi (15,700 km; 9,800 mi) at 10 knots (19 km/h; 12 mph) surfaced; 80 nmi (150 km; 92 mi) at 4 knots (7.4 km/h; 4.6 mph) submerged
- Test depth: 230 m (750 ft); Crush depth: 250–295 m (820–968 ft)
- Complement: 4 officers, 40–56 enlisted
- Armament: 5 × 53.3 cm (21 in) torpedo tubes (four bow, one stern); 14 × G7e torpedoes or 26 TMA mines; 1 × 8.8 cm (3.46 in) deck gun(220 rounds); 1 × 3.7 cm (1.5 in) Flak M42 AA gun; 2 × twin 2 cm (0.79 in) C/30 anti-aircraft guns

Service record
- Part of: 5th U-boat Flotilla; 14 August 1943 – 31 May 1944; 3rd U-boat Flotilla; 1 June – 5 July 1944; 5th U-boat Flotilla; 6 – 31 July 1944; 8th U-boat Flotilla; 1 August 1944 – 15 February 1945; 5th U-boat Flotilla; 16 February – 23 March 1945; 5th U-boat Flotilla; 24 March – 5 April 1945
- Identification codes: M 52 339
- Commanders: Oblt.z.S.d.R Karl-Wilhelm Pancke; 14 August 1943 – February 1945; Oblt.z.S. Heinz Riedel; February – 5 April 1945
- Operations: 7 patrols: 1st patrol: a. 8 – 26 June 1944; b. 27 June 1944; c. 28 June 1944; d. 29 June – 1 July 1944; e. 11 – 14 July 1944; f. 16 July 1944; 2nd patrol: a. 17 – 20 July 1944; b. 21 – 23 July 1944; c. 24 – 26 July 1944; d. 26 – 30 July 1944; e. 1 August 1944; 3rd patrol: a. 23 – 26 August 1944; b. 29 August – 1 September 1944; c. 3 September 1944; d. 12 September 1944; 4th patrol: a. 21 – 28 September 1944; b. 30 September – 2 October 1944; 5th patrol: a. 5 – 9 October 1944; b. 10 – 11 October 1944; 6th patrol: a. 12 – 30 January 1945; b. 23 – 25 February 1945; c. 28 February – 1 March 1945; 7th patrol: 4 March – 5 April 1945
- Victories: 2 merchant ship sunk (2,095 GRT); 1 auxiliary warship sunk (500 GRT)

German submarine U-242 was a Type VIIC U-boat of Nazi Germany's Kriegsmarine during World War II.

The submarine was laid down on 30 September 1942 at the Friedrich Krupp Germaniawerft yard at Kiel as yard number 676, launched on 20 July 1943 and commissioned on 14 August under the command of Oberleutnant zur See Karl-Wilhelm Pancke.

After training with the 5th U-boat Flotilla at Kiel, she went to the 3rd flotilla to work operationally from 1 June 1944. She then returned to the 5th flotilla on 6 July and moved to the 8th flotilla for operations on 1 August. She was reassigned to the 5th flotilla a third time from 16 February 1945.

In seven patrols, U-242 sank two ships totalling 2,095 gross register tons (GRT) and an auxiliary warship of 500 GRT.

She was sunk by a mine in the St. George's Channel on 5 April 1945.

== Design ==
German Type VIIC submarines were preceded by the shorter Type VIIB submarines. U-242 had a displacement of 769 tonnes (757 long tons) when at the surface and 871 tonnes (857 long tons) while submerged. She had a total length of 67.10 m (220 ft 2 in), a pressure hull length of 50.50 m (165 ft 8 in), a beam of 6.20 m (20 ft 4 in), a height of 9.60 m (31 ft 6 in), and a draught of 4.74 m (15 ft 7 in). The submarine was powered by two Germaniawerft F46 four-stroke, six-cylinder supercharged diesel engines producing a total of 2,800 to 3,200 metric horsepower (2,060 to 2,350 kW; 2,760 to 3,160 shp) for use while surfaced, two AEG GU 460/8–27 double-acting electric motors producing a total of 750 metric horsepower (550 kW; 740 shp) for use while submerged. She had two shafts and two 1.23 m (4 ft) propellers. The boat was capable of operating at depths of up to 230 metres (750 ft).

The submarine had a maximum surface speed of 17.7 knots (32.8 km/h; 20.4 mph) and a maximum submerged speed of 7.6 knots (14.1 km/h; 8.7 mph). When submerged, the boat could operate for 80 nautical miles (150 km; 92 mi) at 4 knots (7.4 km/h; 4.6 mph); when surfaced, she could travel 8,500 nautical miles (15,700 km; 9,800 mi) at 10 knots (19 km/h; 12 mph). U-242 was fitted with five 53.3 cm (21 in) torpedo tubes (four fitted at the bow and one at the stern), fourteen torpedoes, one 8.8 cm (3.46 in) SK C/35 naval gun, (220 rounds), one 3.7 cm (1.5 in) Flak M42 and two twin 2 cm (0.79 in) C/30 anti-aircraft guns. The boat had a complement of between forty-four and sixty.

== Service history ==
=== First patrol ===
U-242's first patrol, like most of the others, was carried out in Norwegian and Baltic waters. She had already made the short voyage from Kiel to Stavanger in Norway in May 1944; her first patrol proper started from the Norwegian port and terminated in Bergen, also in Norway. She then spent some time shuttling between Bergen, Stavanger, Kristiansand, Kiel, Reval (also known as Tallinn in Estonia), and Helsinki in Finland.

=== Second patrol ===
The boat's second foray was similar to the first, a series of short 'jabs' from Helsinki and Grand Hotel.

=== Third patrol ===
U-242 sank the Soviet barge VRD-96 Del'fin and the survey ship KKO-2 on 25 August 1944; one day before returning to Helsinki.

=== Fourth, fifth and sixth patrols ===
More round-robin journeys were carried out, travelling between Paldiski (known to the Germans as Baltisch Port), Windau in Latvia (now known as Ventspils), Pillau (Baltiysk), Danzig (Gdańsk in modern Poland), Horten Naval Base in Norway and Kristiansand. It was during her fifth patrol that the Finnish ship, the Rigel, was sunk on 28 October 1944 by a mine laid by U-242 on 21 September.

=== Seventh patrol and loss ===
For her seventh sortie, she was sent to the waters off southwest Britain. On 5 April 1945, she struck a mine in the St. Georges Channel (between southeast Ireland and Wales), off St. David's Head. Forty-four men died; there were no survivors.

== Summary of raiding history ==
| Date | Ship Name | Nationality | Tonnage (GRT) | Fate |
|---|---|---|---|---|
| 25 August 1944 | KKO-2 | Soviet Union | 600 | Sunk |
| 25 August 1944 | VRD Del'fin | Soviet Navy | 500 | Sunk |
| 28 October 1944 | Rigel | Finland | 1,495 | Sunk (Mine) |

== Bibliography ==
- Busch, Rainer; Röll, Hans-Joachim (1999). German U-boat commanders of World War II : a biographical dictionary. Translated by Brooks, Geoffrey. London, Annapolis, Md: Greenhill Books, Naval Institute Press. ISBN 1-55750-186-6.
- Busch, Rainer; Röll, Hans-Joachim (1999). Deutsche U-Boot-Verluste von September 1939 bis Mai 1945 [German U-boat losses from September 1939 to May 1945]. Der U-Boot-Krieg (in German). Vol. IV. Hamburg, Berlin, Bonn: Mittler. ISBN 3-8132-0514-2.
- Gröner, Erich; Jung, Dieter; Maass, Martin (1991). U-boats and Mine Warfare Vessels. German Warships 1815–1945. Vol. 2. Translated by Thomas, Keith; Magowan, Rachel. London: Conway Maritime Press. ISBN 0-85177-593-4.
- Kemp, Paul (1999). U-Boats Destroyed – German Submarine Losses in the World Wars. London: Arms & Armour. ISBN 1-85409-515-3.
