= Convoys HX 229/SC 122 order of battle =

This is the order of battle during the battle around convoys HX 229 and SC 122 from 16 to 20 March 1943.

== Allied forces ==
Convoy HX 229

== Ships in Convoy HX 229 ==
Name	Flag	Tonnage (GRT)	Notes
Abraham Lincoln (1929)	Norway	5,740	Capt M J D Mayall Rd RNR (Commodore)
HMS Anemone (K48)	Royal Navy		Escort 14 Mar - 21 Mar; Rescued 94 Survivors
HMCS Annapolis (I04)	Royal Canadian Navy		Escort 12 Mar - 14 Mar
Antar (1941)	United Kingdom	5,222	
HMS Aquamarine (4.00)	Royal Navy		Escort 22 Mar - 23 Mar; ASW Trawler
Belgian Gulf (1929)	Panama	8,237	
HMS Beverley	Royal Navy		Escort 14 Mar - 22 Mar; Rescued 30 Survivors
Canadian Star (1939)	United Kingdom	8,293	Sunk by U-221
Cape Breton (1940)	United Kingdom	6,044	
HMCS Chelsea	Royal Canadian Navy		Escort 8 Mar - 12 Mar
City Of Agra (1936)	United Kingdom	6,361	
Clan Matheson (1919)	United Kingdom	5,613	Vice-Commodore's Ship
Coracero (1923)	United Kingdom	7,252	Sunk by U-384
Daniel Webster (1943)	United States	7,176	
El Mundo (1910)	Panama	6,035	
Elin K (1937)	Norway	5,214	Sunk
Empire Cavalier (1942)	United Kingdom	9,891	
Empire Knight (1942)	United Kingdom	7,244	
Fort Anne (1943)	United Kingdom	7,134	
HMCS Fredericton (K245)	Royal Canadian Navy		Escort 8 Mar - 14 Mar
Gulfdisc (1938)	United States	7,141	
Harry Luckenbach (1919)	United States	6,366	Sunk by U-91
HMS Highlander (H44)	Royal Navy		Escort 18 Mar - 22 Mar
Hugh Williamson (1942)	United States	7,177	
Irenee Du Pont (1941)	United States	6,125	Sunk by U-600 &U-91
James Oglethorpe (1943)	United States	7,176	Hit by U-758. Later lost; cause unknown
Jean (1918)	United States	4,902	
Kaipara (1938)	United Kingdom	5,882	
Kofresi (1920)	United States	4,934	
Luculus (1929)	United Kingdom	6,546	
Magdala (1931)	Netherlands	8,248	
HMS Mansfield (G76)	Royal Navy		Escort 15 Mar - 18 Mar; Rescued 20 Survivors
Margaret Lykes (1919)	United States	3,537	
Mathew Luckenbach (1918)	United States	5,848	Romped 18 Mar. Sunk 19 Mar by U-527
Nariva (1920)	United Kingdom	8,714	Sunk by U-600 & U-91
Nebraska (1920)	United Kingdom	8,261	
Nicania (1942)	United Kingdom	8,179	
HMCS Oakville (K178)	Royal Canadian Navy		Escort 8 Mar - 14 Mar
Pan-Rhode Island (1941)	United States	7,742	
HMS Pennywort (K111)	Royal Navy		Escort 15 Mar - 21 Mar; Rescued 90 Survivors
Regent Panther (1937)	United Kingdom	9,556	
Robert Howe (1943)	United States	7,177	
San Veronico (1942)	United Kingdom	8,189	
HMCS Sherbrooke (K152)	Royal Canadian Navy		Escort 21 Mar - 22 Mar
Southern Princess (1915)	United Kingdom	12,156	Sunk by U-600
Stephen C Foster (1943)	United States	7,196	Returned
Tekoa (1922)	United Kingdom	8,695	138 Survivors Onboard
Terkoeli (1923)	Netherlands	5,158	Sunk by U-631
USCGC Ingham (WHEC-35)	United States Navy		Escort 19 Mar - 21 Mar
USS Babbitt (DD-128)	United States		Escort 19 Mar - 21 Mar
USS Kendrick (DD-612)	United States		Escort 8 Mar - 14 Mar
HMS Vimy	Royal Navy		Escort 19 Mar - 22 Mar. Joined From Iceland
HMS Volunteer (D71)	Royal Navy		Escort 14 Mar - 21 Mar; Rescued 66 Survivors
Walter Q Gresham (1943)	United States	7,191	Sunk by U-221
William Eustis (1943)	United States	7,196	Sunk by U-435 & U-91
HMS Witherington (D76)	Royal Navy		Escort 15 Mar - 15 Mar; Detached With Weather Damage
Zaanland (1921)	Netherlands	6,813	Sunk by U-758

Escort Group B-4

- Destroyers: HMS Volunteer (D71) (SOE till 18th), HMS Beverley, HMS Witherington (D76), HMS Mansfield (G76), HMS Highlander (H44) (SOE from 18th)
- Corvettes : HMS Anemone, HMS Pennywort, HMCS Sherbrooke (K152)

== Ships in Convoy SC 122 ==
Name	Flag	Tonnage (GRT)	Notes
Alcedo (1937)	Panama	1,392	Halifax
Alderamin (1920)	Netherlands	7,886	Sunk
Asbjorn (1935)	United Kingdom	4,387	Halifax
Askepot (1937)	Norway	1,312	Iceland
Atland (1910)	Sweden	5,203	
Aymeric (1919)	United Kingdom	5,196	
Badjestan (1928)	United Kingdom	5,573	
Baron Elgin (1933)	United Kingdom	3,942	
Baron Semple (1939)	United Kingdom	4,573	
Baron Stranraer (1929)	United Kingdom	3,668	
Beaconoil (1919)	United Kingdom	6,893	
Benedick (1928)	United Kingdom	6,978	
HMCS Blairmore (J314)	Royal Canadian Navy		Escort 5 Mar - 09 Mar
Bonita (1918)	Panama	4,929	
Boston City (1920)	United Kingdom	2,870	
Bridgepool (1924)	United Kingdom	4,845	
HMS Buttercup (K193)	Royal Navy		Escort 12 Mar - 23 Mar
HMS Campobello (T278)	Royal Navy		Escort 12 Mar - 16 Mar; ASW trawler
Carras (1918)	Greece	5,234	Sunk by U-666 & U-333
Carso (1923)	United Kingdom	6,149	
Cartago (1908)	United States	4,732	Iceland
Christian Holm (1927)	United Kingdom	9,119	
Clarissa Radcliffe (1915)	United Kingdom	5,754	Straggled, Sunk by U-663
HMCS Cowichan (J146)	Royal Canadian Navy		Escort 8 Mar - 12 Mar
Dolius (1924)	United Kingdom	5,507	
Drakepool (1924)	United Kingdom	4,838	
HMCS Dunvegan (K177)	Royal Canadian Navy		Escort 8 Mar - 12 Mar
Eastern Guide (1919)	United States	3,704	Iceland
Empire Dunstan (1942)	United Kingdom	2,887	
Empire Galahad (1942)	United Kingdom	7,046	
Empire Morn (1941)	United Kingdom	7,092	CAM ship
Empire Summer (1941)	United Kingdom	6,949	Returned
English Monarch (1924)	United Kingdom	4,557	Returned With hull defects
Filleigh (1928)	United Kingdom	4,856	
Fjallfoss (1919)	Iceland	1,451	
Fort Cedar Lake (1942)	United Kingdom	7,134	Sunk by U-338 & U-665
Franka (1918)	Yugoslavia	5,273	
Georgios P (1903)	Greece	4,052	Returned New York City
Glenapp (1920)	United Kingdom	9,503	
Gloxinia (1920)	United Kingdom	3,336	
Godafoss (1921)	Iceland	1,542	
HMS Godetia (K226)	Royal Navy		Escort 12 Mar - 22 Mar
Granville (1913)	Panama	4,071	Sunk by U-338
Gudvor (1928)	Norway	2,280	Halifax
HMS Havelock (H88)	Royal Navy		Escort 12 Mar - 22 Mar
Helencrest (1941)	United Kingdom	5,233	
Historian (1924)	United Kingdom	5,074	
Innesmoor (1928)	United Kingdom	4,392	
Kedoe (1921)	Netherlands	3,684	
King Gruffydd (1919)	United Kingdom	5,072	Sunk by U-338
Kingsbury (1937)	United Kingdom	4,898	Sunk by U-338
HMS Lavender	Royal Navy		Escort 12 Mar - 23 Mar
HMCS Leamington	Royal Canadian Navy		Escort 8 Mar - 12 Mar
Livingston (1928)	United Kingdom	2,140	Returned New York City
Losada (1921)	United Kingdom	6,520	
LST 305	Royal Navy		Tank landing craft
LST 365	Royal Navy		Tank landing craft
McKeesport (1919)	United States	6,198	Returned
HMCS New Westminster (K228)	Royal Canadian Navy		Escort 5 Mar - 09 Mar
Ogmore Castle (1919)	United Kingdom	2,481	
Orminster (1914)	United Kingdom	5,712	
P.L.M.13 (1921)	United Kingdom	3,754	Arrived St Johns Newfoundland With Boiler Defects
Parkhaven (1920)	Netherlands	4,803	
Permian (1931)	Panama	8,890	Halifax
HMS Pimpernel	Royal Navy		Escort 12 Mar - 23 Mar
Polarland (1923)	Norway	1,591	Returned New York City
Porjus (1906)	Sweden	2,965	
Port Auckland (1922)	United Kingdom	8,789	Sunk by U-305
Reaveley (1940)	United Kingdom	4,998	Later Took Pos'n 83
HMCS Rimouski (K121)	Royal Canadian Navy		Escort 5 Mar - 09 Mar
HMS Saxifrage (K04)	Royal Navy		Escort 11 Mar - 23 Mar
Selfoss (1914)	Iceland	775	Detached 17 Mar Arr Reykjavik 22 Mar
Sevilla (1921)	Norway	1,383	St Johns Nf
Shirvan (1925)	United Kingdom	6,017	
HMS Swale	Royal Navy		Escort 12 Mar - 23 Mar
HMCS The Pas	Royal Canadian Navy		Escort 5 Mar - 09 Mar
USCGC Ingham	United States Navy		Escort -
USS Babbitt	United States Navy		Escort -
USS Upshur	United States Navy		Escort 12 Mar - 16 Mar
Vinriver (1917)	United Kingdom	3,881	
Vistula (1920)	United States	8,537	
Zamalek (1921)	United Kingdom	1,567	Rescue Ship, 165 Survivors
Zouave (1930)	United Kingdom	4,256	Sunk by U-305

B-5 Escort Group

- Destroyers: HMS Havelock (H88) (SOE), USS Upshur (DD-144)
- Frigate: HMS Swale (K217)
- Corvettes: HMS Buttercup (K193), HMS Godetia (K226), HMS Lavender (K60), HMS Pimpernel, HMS Saxifrage (K04)
- Naval Trawler: HMS Campobello (T378)

Reinforcements

- Destroyers: USS Babbitt (DD-128), HMS Vimy
- USCG Cutter: USCGC Ingham (WHEC-35)

== Axis forces ==
Raubgraf

- U-84, U-89, U-91
- U-435 U-468
- U-600, U-603, U-615, U-621, U-635, U-638, U-653, U-664
- U-758

Stürmer

- U-134, U-190
- U-229
- U-305, U-338, U-384
- U-523, U-526, U-527, U-598
- U-616, U-618, U-631, U-641, U-642, U-665, U-666

Dranger

- U-86
- U-221
- U-333, U-373
- U-406, U-440
- U-590
- U-608, U-610

== Bibliography ==
- Stephen Roskill : The War at Sea 1939–1945 Vol II (1956). ISBN (none)
- Dan van der Vat : The Atlantic Campaign (1988). ISBN 0-340-37751-8
- Arnold Hague : The Allied Convoy System 1939–1945 (2000). ISBN 1 55125 033 0 (Canada); ISBN 1 86176 147 3 (UK)
- Niestle, Axel (1998). German U-Boat Losses During World War II. Greenhill. ISBN 1-85367-352-8.
- Kemp, Paul (1997). U-Boats Destroyed, German submarine losses in the World Wars. Arms and Armour. ISBN 1-85409-515-3.
