= German submarine U-386 =

German Type VII C world war II u-boat

History

Nazi Germany
- Name: U-386
- Ordered: 15 August 1940
- Builder: Howaldtswerke, Kiel
- Yard number: 17
- Laid down: 16 May 1941
- Launched: 19 August 1942
- Commissioned: 10 October 1942
- Fate: Sunk on 19 February 1944

General characteristics
- Class & type: Type VIIC submarine
- Displacement: 769 tonnes (757 long tons) surfaced; 871 t (857 long tons) submerged
- Length: 67.10 m (220 ft 2 in) o/a; 50.50 m (165 ft 8 in) pressure hull
- Beam: 6.20 m (20 ft 4 in) o/a; 4.70 m (15 ft 5 in) pressure hull
- Height: 9.60 m (31 ft 6 in)
- Draught: 4.74 m (15 ft 7 in)
- Installed power: 2,800–3,200 PS (2,100–2,400 kW; 2,800–3,200 bhp) (diesels); 750 PS (550 kW; 740 shp) (electric)
- Propulsion: 2 shafts; 2 × diesel engines; 2 × electric motors.
- Speed: 17.7 knots (32.8 km/h; 20.4 mph) surfaced; 7.6 knots (14.1 km/h; 8.7 mph) submerged
- Range: 8,500 nmi (15,700 km; 9,800 mi) at 10 knots (19 km/h; 12 mph) surfaced; 80 nmi (150 km; 92 mi) at 4 knots (7.4 km/h; 4.6 mph) submerged
- Test depth: 230 m (750 ft); Crush depth: 250–295 m (820–968 ft)
- Complement: 4 officers, 40–56 enlisted
- Armament: 5 × 53.3 cm (21 in) torpedo tubes (four bow, one stern); 14 × torpedoes; 1 × 8.8 cm (3.46 in) deck gun (220 rounds); 2 × twin 2 cm (0.79 in) C/30 anti-aircraft guns

Service record
- Part of: 5th U-boat Flotilla; 10 October 1942 – 30 April 1943; 6th U-boat Flotilla; 1 May – 19 February 1944
- Identification codes: M 50 010
- Commanders: Oblt.z.S. Hans-Albrecht Kandler; 10 October 1942 – 10 June 1943; Oblt.z.S. Rolf Heinrich Fritz Albrecht; 10 June 1943 – 19 February 1944
- Operations: 4 patrols: 1st patrol: 15 April – 11 May 1943; 2nd patrol: 29 June – 8 July 1943; 3rd patrol: 29 August – 8 October 1943; 4th patrol: 26 December 1943 – 19 February 1944
- Victories: 1 merchant ship sunk (1,997 GRT)

German submarine U-386 was a Type VIIC U-boat of Nazi Germany's Kriegsmarine during World War II.

She carried out four patrols. She sank one ship.

She was a member of five wolfpacks.

She was sunk by a British warship in mid-Atlantic on 19 February 1944.

== Design ==
German Type VIIC submarines were preceded by the shorter Type VIIB submarines. U-386 had a displacement of 769 tonnes (757 long tons) when at the surface and 871 tonnes (857 long tons) while submerged. She had a total length of 67.10 m (220 ft 2 in), a pressure hull length of 50.50 m (165 ft 8 in), a beam of 6.20 m (20 ft 4 in), a height of 9.60 m (31 ft 6 in), and a draught of 4.74 m (15 ft 7 in). The submarine was powered by two Germaniawerft F46 four-stroke, six-cylinder supercharged diesel engines producing a total of 2,800 to 3,200 metric horsepower (2,060 to 2,350 kW; 2,760 to 3,160 shp) for use while surfaced, two Garbe, Lahmeyer & Co. RP 137/c double-acting electric motors producing a total of 750 metric horsepower (550 kW; 740 shp) for use while submerged. She had two shafts and two 1.23 m (4 ft) propellers. The boat was capable of operating at depths of up to 230 metres (750 ft).

The submarine had a maximum surface speed of 17.7 knots (32.8 km/h; 20.4 mph) and a maximum submerged speed of 7.6 knots (14.1 km/h; 8.7 mph). When submerged, the boat could operate for 80 nautical miles (150 km; 92 mi) at 4 knots (7.4 km/h; 4.6 mph); when surfaced, she could travel 8,500 nautical miles (15,700 km; 9,800 mi) at 10 knots (19 km/h; 12 mph). U-386 was fitted with five 53.3 cm (21 in) torpedo tubes (four fitted at the bow and one at the stern), fourteen torpedoes, one 8.8 cm (3.46 in) SK C/35 naval gun, 220 rounds, and two twin 2 cm (0.79 in) C/30 anti-aircraft guns. The boat had a complement of between forty-four and sixty.

== Service history ==
The submarine was laid down on 16 May 1941 at the Howaldtswerke yard at Kiel as yard number 17, launched on 19 August 1942 and commissioned on 10 October under the command of Oberleutnant zur See Hans-Albrecht Kandler.

She served with the 5th U-boat Flotilla from 10 October 1942 and the 6th flotilla from 1 May 1943 until her loss.

=== 1st patrol ===
U-386's first patrol took her from Kiel in Germany to St. Nazaire in occupied France via the gap between Iceland and the Faroe Islands. She sank the Rosenborg which went down in 30 seconds. There were two survivors.

The boat was attacked by the escorts of Convoy ONS 5 on 28 April 1943. Severe damage was caused.

=== 2nd and 3rd patrols ===
The submarine's second sortie was relatively uneventful, but her third, which commenced on 29 August 1943, included a surprise attack by an unidentified aircraft off Cape Finisterre on 6 September. The boat was caught unaware due to the malfunctioning of the Wanze detector. Wanze means 'bug' in German.

She was also attacked by a British B-24 Liberator of No. 120 Squadron RAF on the 20th. The aircraft dropped a homing torpedo which caused no damage.

U-386 was forced into breaking off an attack a day later after being heavily depth charged.

=== 4th patrol and loss ===
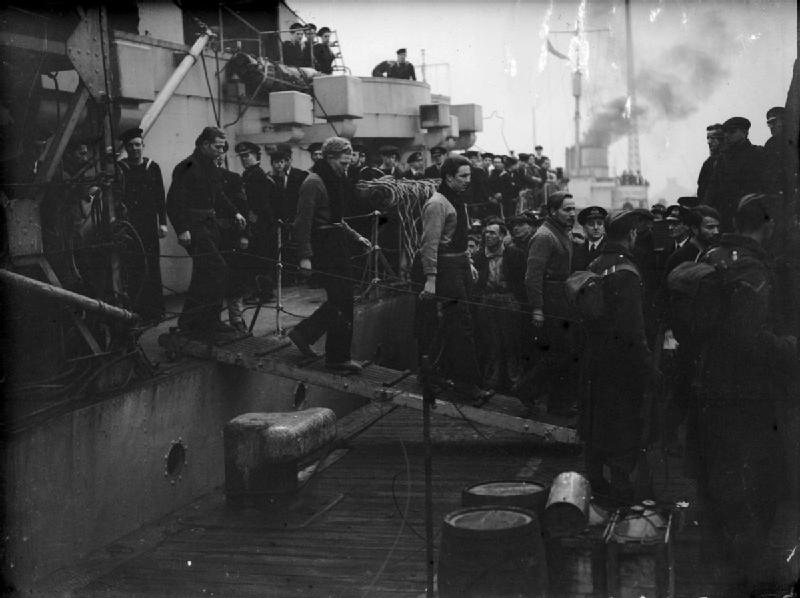
Survivors from U-406 and U-386 being brought ashore from HMS Spey at Liverpool.

The boat had departed St. Nazaire on 26 December 1943. Exactly a month later (26 January 1944), she was off the west coast of Scotland, north of the island of Islay. She was sunk by depth charges dropped by the British frigate HMS Spey on 19 February 1944.

Thirty-three men died from the U-boat; there were 16 survivors.

=== Wolfpacks ===
U-386 took part in five wolfpacks, namely:

- Star (27 – 30 April 1943)
- Leuthen (15 – 21 September 1943)
- Stürmer (26 January – 3 February 1944)
- Igel 1 (3 – 17 February 1944)
- Hai 1 (17 – 19 February 1944)

== Summary of raiding history ==
Date	Ship Name	Nationality	Tonnage (GRT)	Fate
25 April 1943	Rosenborg	United Kingdom	1,997	Sunk

== Bibliography ==
- Busch, Rainer; Röll, Hans-Joachim (1999). German U-boat commanders of World War II : a biographical dictionary. Translated by Brooks, Geoffrey. London, Annapolis, Md: Greenhill Books, Naval Institute Press. ISBN 1-55750-186-6.
- Busch, Rainer; Röll, Hans-Joachim (1999). Deutsche U-Boot-Verluste von September 1939 bis Mai 1945 [German U-boat losses from September 1939 to May 1945]. Der U-Boot-Krieg (in German). Vol. IV. Hamburg, Berlin, Bonn: Mittler. ISBN 3-8132-0514-2.
- Edwards, Bernard (1996). Dönitz and the Wolf Packs – The U-boats at War. Cassell Military Classics. pp. 193, 217. ISBN 0-304-35203-9.
- Gröner, Erich; Jung, Dieter; Maass, Martin (1991). U-boats and Mine Warfare Vessels. German Warships 1815–1945. Vol. 2. Translated by Thomas, Keith; Magowan, Rachel. London: Conway Maritime Press. ISBN 0-85177-593-4.
- Kemp, Paul (1999). U-Boats Destroyed – German Submarine Losses in the World Wars. London: Arms & Armour. ISBN 1-85409-515-3.
