= German submarine U-382 =

German World War II submarine

History

Nazi Germany
- Name: U-382
- Ordered: 16 October 1939
- Builder: Howaldtswerke, Kiel
- Yard number: 13
- Laid down: 30 July 1941
- Launched: 21 March 1942
- Commissioned: 25 April 1942
- Fate: Badly damaged in Wilhelmshaven by British bombs on 12 January 1945; raised on 20 March; scuttled on 5 May

General characteristics
- Class & type: Type VIIC submarine
- Displacement: 769 tonnes (757 long tons) surfaced; 871 t (857 long tons) submerged
- Length: 67.10 m (220 ft 2 in) o/a; 50.50 m (165 ft 8 in) pressure hull
- Beam: 6.20 m (20 ft 4 in) o/a; 4.70 m (15 ft 5 in) pressure hull
- Height: 9.60 m (31 ft 6 in)
- Draught: 4.74 m (15 ft 7 in)
- Installed power: 2,800–3,200 PS (2,100–2,400 kW; 2,800–3,200 bhp) (diesels); 750 PS (550 kW; 740 shp) (electric)
- Propulsion: 2 shafts; 2 × diesel engines; 2 × electric motors.
- Speed: 17.7 knots (32.8 km/h; 20.4 mph) surfaced; 7.6 knots (14.1 km/h; 8.7 mph) submerged
- Range: 8,500 nmi (15,700 km; 9,800 mi) at 10 knots (19 km/h; 12 mph) surfaced; 80 nmi (150 km; 92 mi) at 4 knots (7.4 km/h; 4.6 mph) submerged
- Test depth: 230 m (750 ft); Crush depth: 250–295 m (820–968 ft)
- Complement: 4 officers, 40–56 enlisted
- Armament: 5 × 53.3 cm (21 in) torpedo tubes (four bow, one stern); 14 × torpedoes; 1 × 8.8 cm (3.46 in) deck gun (220 rounds); 1 x 2 cm (0.79 in) C/30 AA gun

Service record
- Part of: 5th U-boat Flotilla; 25 April – 30 September 1942; 7th U-boat Flotilla; 1 October 1942 – 31 October 1944; 33rd U-boat Flotilla; 1 November 1944 – 20 March 1945
- Identification codes: M 46 120
- Commanders: Kptlt. Herbert Juli; 25 April 1942 – 1 April 1943; Oblt.z.S. Leopold Koch; 1 April – 14 November 1943; Oblt.z.S. Rudolf Zorn; 15 November 1943 – 16 July 1944; Oblt.z.S. Ernst-August Gerke; May – 29 June 1944; Oblt.z.S. Hans-Dietrich Wilke; 25 August 1944 – 14 January 1945; Oblt.z.S. Günther Schimmel; 24 January – 20 March 1945
- Operations: 7 patrols: 1st patrol: 10 September – 31 October 1942; 2nd patrol: 7 February – 8 March 1943; 3rd patrol: 8 – 24 April 1943; 4th patrol: 19 June – 7 September 1943; 5th patrol: 8 December 1943 – 26 January 1944; 6th patrol: 6 – 15 June 1944; 7th patrol: a. 10 September – 19 October 1944; b. 22 October – 5 November 1944
- Victories: 1 merchant ship damaged (9,811 GRT)

German submarine U-382 was a Type VIIC U-boat of Nazi Germany's Kriegsmarine during World War II.

She carried out seven patrols before being badly damaged by British bombs in Wilhelmshaven on 12 January 1945.

She was a member of eight wolfpacks.

She damaged one ship.

== Design ==
German Type VIIC submarines were preceded by the shorter Type VIIB submarines. U-382 had a displacement of 769 tonnes (757 long tons) when at the surface and 871 tonnes (857 long tons) while submerged. She had a total length of 67.10 m (220 ft 2 in), a pressure hull length of 50.50 m (165 ft 8 in), a beam of 6.20 m (20 ft 4 in), a height of 9.60 m (31 ft 6 in), and a draught of 4.74 m (15 ft 7 in). The submarine was powered by two Germaniawerft F46 four-stroke, six-cylinder supercharged diesel engines producing a total of 2,800 to 3,200 metric horsepower (2,060 to 2,350 kW; 2,760 to 3,160 shp) for use while surfaced, two Garbe, Lahmeyer & Co. RP 137/c double-acting electric motors producing a total of 750 metric horsepower (550 kW; 740 shp) for use while submerged. She had two shafts and two 1.23 m (4 ft) propellers. The boat was capable of operating at depths of up to 230 metres (750 ft).

The submarine had a maximum surface speed of 17.7 knots (32.8 km/h; 20.4 mph) and a maximum submerged speed of 7.6 knots (14.1 km/h; 8.7 mph). When submerged, the boat could operate for 80 nautical miles (150 km; 92 mi) at 4 knots (7.4 km/h; 4.6 mph); when surfaced, she could travel 8,500 nautical miles (15,700 km; 9,800 mi) at 10 knots (19 km/h; 12 mph). U-382 was fitted with five 53.3 cm (21 in) torpedo tubes (four fitted at the bow and one at the stern), fourteen torpedoes, one 8.8 cm (3.46 in) SK C/35 naval gun, 220 rounds, and a 2 cm (0.79 in) C/30 anti-aircraft gun. The boat had a complement of between forty-four and sixty.

== Service history ==
The submarine was laid down on 30 July 1941 at the Howaldtswerke yard at Kiel as yard number 13, launched on 21 March 1942 and commissioned on 25 April under the command of Kapitänleutnant Herbert Juli.

=== First patrol ===
The boat's first patrol commenced with her departure from Kiel on 10 September 1942. Passing through the gap between Iceland and the Faroe Islands, she was depth charged by an unknown aircraft in mid-Atlantic on 12 October. The damage sustained was serious enough to cut the patrol short. The submarine docked in St. Nazaire in occupied France on the 31st.

=== Second and third patrols ===
Another depth charge attack by the escorts of Convoy UC 1 south of the Azores forced the boat to withdraw to Lorient on 8 March 1943.

During her third foray, she was depth charged for 16 hours by the escorts of Convoy HX 233 west of the Bay of Biscay before arriving at St. Nazaire on 24 April 1943.

=== Fourth, fifth and sixth patrols ===
This sortie (number four), took the boat to Liberia and the Ivory Coast on the west African coast and at 81 days, it was her longest.

During her fifth patrol, U-382 was attacked and severely damaged northeast of the Azores on 11 January 1944. Two days later, she was also attacked by destroyers of the USS Block Island hunter/killer group.

With the Allied landings at Normandy on 6 June 1944, the boat left St. Nazaire and docked further south at La Pallice on the 15th.

=== Seventh patrol ===
It was decided to move U-382 from France to Norway. She left La Pallice on 10 September 1944, negotiated the Iceland/Faroes 'gap' in the other direction and arrived in Bergen on 19 October.

=== Fate ===
Having sailed to Flensburg in November 1944, U-382 was badly damaged by the RAF in a raid on Wilhelmshaven on 12 January 1945. She was raised on 20 March but scuttled on 5 May.

=== Wolfpacks ===
U-382 took part in eight wolfpacks, namely:

- Luchs (27 September – 6 October 1942)
- Panther (6 – 11 October 1942)
- Leopard (12 – 13 October 1942)
- Robbe (16 – 25 February 1943)
- Without name (15 – 18 April 1943)
- Borkum (18 December – 3 January 1944)
- Borkum 1 (3 – 13 January 1944)
- Rügen (13 – 15 January 1944)

== Summary of raiding history ==
Date	Ship Name	Nationality	Tonnage (GRT)	Fate
23 February 1943	Empire Norseman	United Kingdom	9,811	Damaged

== Bibliography ==
- Busch, Rainer; Röll, Hans-Joachim (1999). German U-boat commanders of World War II : a biographical dictionary. Translated by Brooks, Geoffrey. London, Annapolis, Md: Greenhill Books, Naval Institute Press. ISBN 1-55750-186-6.
- Busch, Rainer; Röll, Hans-Joachim (1999). Deutsche U-Boot-Verluste von September 1939 bis Mai 1945 [German U-boat losses from September 1939 to May 1945]. Der U-Boot-Krieg (in German). Vol. IV. Hamburg, Berlin, Bonn: Mittler. ISBN 3-8132-0514-2.
- Gröner, Erich; Jung, Dieter; Maass, Martin (1991). U-boats and Mine Warfare Vessels. German Warships 1815–1945. Vol. 2. Translated by Thomas, Keith; Magowan, Rachel. London: Conway Maritime Press. ISBN 0-85177-593-4.
- Kemp, Paul (1999). U-Boats Destroyed – German Submarine Losses in the World Wars. London: Arms & Armour. ISBN 1-85409-515-3.
