= Bert Peters =

Australian rules footballer

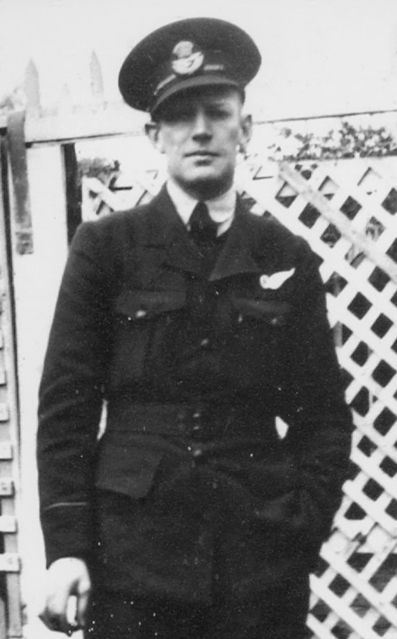

Personal information
- Full name: Albert Otto Peters
- Nickname: Snowy
- Born: 8 August 1908; St Arnaud, Victoria
- Died: 13 June 1944 (aged 35); Bay of Biscay, off German submarine U-270
- Height: 177 cm (5 ft 10 in)
- Weight: 77 kg (170 lb)

Playing career^{1}
Years	Club	Games (Goals)
1920-29, 32-34	Wonthaggi	
1930–1931	North Melbourne	17 (3)
1935	Cranbourne	
1936	Hastings	8 (unknown)
1937	Dromana-Rosebud (combine)	
1938–1940	Sorrento	46 (unknown)
- ^{1} Playing statistics correct to the end of 1931.

Career highlights
- 1940 Sorrento B&F *1938-40 Sorrento playing captain-coach

Albert Otto "Snowy" Peters (8 August 1908 – 13 June 1944) was an Australian rules footballer who played with North Melbourne in the Victorian Football League (VFL). He was nicknamed "Snow", "Snowie" or "Snowy", for his very thick straight fair hair.

== Family ==
The son of Carl Erich Theodore Otto Peters (1872–1950), and Harriet Cordelia Peters (1874–1970), née Bond, Albert Otto Peters was born at St Arnaud, Victoria on 8 August 1908. Eric drove gold mine trains in St. Arnaud before and after serving in the Boer War. When Snowy was young Eric relocated his big family to Wonthaggi some 378 km to drive coal engines. Eric and Harriet are buried in Wonthaggi Cemetery.

Bert married Ruby Anzac Kernot (1916–68) a fisherman's daughter of Tooradin in September 1939. She died in Queensland aged 52.

== Football career ==
Bert was one of seven North Melbourne players to make their league debut in the opening round of the 1930 VFL season. By the end of the year he had played 12 games and he added another five in the 1931 season, which would be his last. In each of his 17 appearances for North Melbourne, Peters finished on the losing team. This included a 168-point loss to Richmond at Punt Road Oval. The 199 points conceded by North Melbourne in that game remained a league record until 1969.

Bert spent the remainder of his football career on the Mornington Peninsula. He captain-coached Mornington Peninsula Football League club Sorrento from 1938 to 1940 and led them to the finals in each of those years, including the 1940 grand final against victors Somerville-Baxter. Before coming to Sorrento, Peters played for Dromana District in 1937. Prior clubs were Wonthaggi up to 1930 then again 1932-34 then Cranbourne (1935) and Hastings (1936).

== Military service ==
Bert was working as a teacher in Red Hill South, Victoria when he enlisted with the Royal Australian Air Force in 1941. He came to England in June 1943 for operational training. His first posting was to the No. 455 Squadron RAAF and then the No. 53 Squadron RAF, which were based in Cornwall.

== Death ==
On 13 June 1944, Peters was a navigator on board the No. 53 Squadron's B-24 Liberator BZ818/C which had been sent to the Bay of Biscay to perform an anti-submarine patrol. The plane was shot down by German submarine U-270, with all crew members killed.

Bert's body was never recovered. He is commemorated at the Air Forces Memorial, at Runnymede, and by a gumtree in Wonthaggi and on a plaque with his wife at All Saints Church Tooradin and another plaque in the Peace Garden at the Red Hill Consolidated School organised by ex-pupil and later Shire of Flinders President, Keith Holmes.

== See also ==
- List of Victorian Football League players who died on active service
