= German submarine U-758 =

German World War II submarine

History

Nazi Germany
- Name: U-758
- Ordered: 9 October 1939
- Builder: Kriegsmarinewerft Wilhelmshaven
- Yard number: 141
- Laid down: 18 May 1940
- Launched: 1 March 1942
- Commissioned: 5 May 1942
- Decommissioned: 16 March 1945
- Fate: Broken up in 1946 or 1947

General characteristics
- Class & type: Type VIIC submarine
- Displacement: 769 tonnes (757 long tons) surfaced; 871 t (857 long tons) submerged
- Length: 67.10 m (220 ft 2 in) o/a; 50.50 m (165 ft 8 in) pressure hull
- Beam: 6.20 m (20 ft 4 in) o/a; 4.70 m (15 ft 5 in) pressure hull
- Height: 9.60 m (31 ft 6 in)
- Draught: 4.74 m (15 ft 7 in)
- Installed power: 2,800–3,200 PS (2,100–2,400 kW; 2,800–3,200 bhp) (diesels); 750 PS (550 kW; 740 shp) (electric)
- Propulsion: 2 shafts; 2 × diesel engines; 2 × electric motors
- Speed: 17.7 knots (32.8 km/h; 20.4 mph) surfaced; 7.6 knots (14.1 km/h; 8.7 mph) submerged
- Range: 8,500 nmi (15,700 km; 9,800 mi) at 10 knots (19 km/h; 12 mph) surfaced; 80 nmi (150 km; 92 mi) at 4 knots (7.4 km/h; 4.6 mph) submerged
- Test depth: 230 m (750 ft); Crush depth: 250–295 m (820–968 ft)
- Complement: 4 officers, 40–56 enlisted
- Armament: 5 × 53.3 cm (21 in) torpedo tubes (4 bow, 1 stern); 14 × torpedoes; 1 × 8.8 cm (3.46 in) deck gun (220 rounds); 1 x 2 cm (0.79 in) C/30 AA gun

Service record
- Part of: 6th U-boat Flotilla; 5 May 1942 – 14 October 1944; 33rd U-boat Flotilla; 15 October 1944 – 16 March 1945
- Commanders: Kptlt. Helmut Manseck; 5 May 1942 – 3 April 1944; Oblt.z.S. Hans-Arend Feindt; 4 April 1944 – 16 March 1945
- Operations: 7 patrols: 1st patrol: 14 November – 24 December 1942; 2nd patrol: 14 February – 30 March 1943; 3rd patrol: a. 15 – 16 May 1943; b. 26 May – 25 June 1943; 4th patrol: 1 September – 24 October 1943; 5th patrol: 16 December 1943 – 20 January 1944; 6th patrol: 6 – 15 June 1944; 7th patrol: a. 23 August – 10 October 1944; b. 13 – 14 October 1944; c. 19 – 25 October 1944
- Victories: 2 merchant ships sunk (13,989 GRT)

German submarine U-758 was a Type VIIC U-boat built for Nazi Germany's Kriegsmarine for service during World War II. Commissioned on 5 May 1942, she served with the 6th U-boat Flotilla until 1 November as a training boat, and as a front boat until 14 October 1944 mostly under the command of Kapitänleutnant Helmut Manseck before joining the 33rd U-boat Flotilla as a training boat for the remainder of her service in the war.

== Design ==
German Type VIIC submarines were preceded by the shorter Type VIIB submarines. U-758 had a displacement of 769 tonnes (757 long tons) when at the surface and 871 tonnes (857 long tons) while submerged. She had a total length of 67.10 m (220 ft 2 in), a pressure hull length of 50.50 m (165 ft 8 in), a beam of 6.20 m (20 ft 4 in), a height of 9.60 m (31 ft 6 in), and a draught of 4.74 m (15 ft 7 in). The submarine was powered by two Germaniawerft F46 four-stroke, six-cylinder supercharged diesel engines producing a total of 2,800 to 3,200 metric horsepower (2,060 to 2,350 kW; 2,760 to 3,160 shp) for use while surfaced, two Garbe, Lahmeyer & Co. RP 137/c double-acting electric motors producing a total of 750 metric horsepower (550 kW; 740 shp) for use while submerged. She had two shafts and two 1.23 m (4 ft) propellers. The boat was capable of operating at depths of up to 230 metres (750 ft).

The submarine had a maximum surface speed of 17.7 knots (32.8 km/h; 20.4 mph) and a maximum submerged speed of 7.6 knots (14.1 km/h; 8.7 mph). When submerged, the boat could operate for 80 nautical miles (150 km; 92 mi) at 4 knots (7.4 km/h; 4.6 mph); when surfaced, she could travel 8,500 nautical miles (15,700 km; 9,800 mi) at 10 knots (19 km/h; 12 mph). U-758 was fitted with five 53.3 cm (21 in) torpedo tubes (four fitted at the bow and one at the stern), fourteen torpedoes, one 8.8 cm (3.46 in) SK C/35 naval gun, 220 rounds, and a 2 cm (0.79 in) C/30 anti-aircraft gun. The boat had a complement of between forty-four and sixty.

== Service history ==
U-758 was one of 12 Type VIIC submarines ordered from Kriegsmarinewerft on 9 October 1939. She was laid down on 18 May 1940 at Kriegsmarinewerft's shipyard in Wilhelmshaven as yard number 141, was launched on 1 March 1942 and was commissioned on 5 May 1942. U-758 served on seven patrols with the 6th U-boat Flotilla.

=== First patrol ===
On 14 November 1942, U-758 left Kiel on her first patrol. She joined patrol group Panzer, which by early December was operating east of Newfoundland. On 7 December 1942, the group was sent against Convoy HX 217. On 8 December, U-758 claimed to have hit a steamer with a torpedo, and early on 10 December, she claimed to have hit three more ships, but none of these claims were confirmed. She arrived at her new base of St. Nazaire in occupied France on 24 December 1942.

=== Second patrol ===
Her second patrol from 14 February until 30 March 1943 was not uneventful. Midway across the Atlantic Ocean on 17 March, U-758 joined Wolfpack Raubgraf and attacked convoy HX 229 which was eastbound, delivering goods from the United States to the United Kingdom. U-758 destroyed two ships from the 37-ship convoy: The Dutch ship Zaanland (6,813 GRT) and the US Liberty Ship James Oglethorpe (7,176 GRT). Torpedoes fired at the Dutch motor tanker Magdala missed their mark.

=== Subsequent patrols ===
U-758 undertook five more combat patrols but did not sink or damage any further ships.

=== Wolfpacks ===
U-758 took part in nine wolfpacks, namely:

- Panzer (23 November – 11 December 1942)
- Sturmbock (21 – 24 February 1943)
- Burggraf (24 – 26 February 1943)
- Wildfang (26 February – 5 March 1943)
- Raubgraf (7 – 20 March 1943)
- Leuthen (15 – 24 September 1943)
- Rossbach (24 September – 9 October 1943)
- Borkum (24 December 1943 – 3 January 1944)
- Borkum 2 (3 – 13 January 1944)

== Fate ==
The veteran submarine was caught in the open during a British raid on the port of Kiel. Badly damaged on 11 March 1945, she was stricken from the navy list on 16 March 1945. At the cessation of hostilities, she was surrendered to the Allies in May 1945. Deemed too badly damaged to be sunk as part of Operation Deadlight, she was instead broken up for scrap beginning in 1946 or 1947.

== Summary of raiding history ==
Date	Ship Name	Nationality	Tonnage (GRT)	Fate
17 March 1943	Zaanland	Netherlands	6,813	Sunk
17 March 1943	James Oglethorpe	United States	7,176	Sunk

== Bibliography ==
- Blair, Clay (2000). Hitler's U-Boat War: The Hunted 1942–1945. New York: Modern Library. ISBN 0-679-64033-9.
- Busch, Rainer; Röll, Hans-Joachim (1999). German U-boat commanders of World War II : a biographical dictionary. Translated by Brooks, Geoffrey. London, Annapolis, Md: Greenhill Books, Naval Institute Press. ISBN 1-55750-186-6.
- Busch, Rainer; Röll, Hans-Joachim (1999). Der U-Boot-Krieg, 1939-1945: Deutsche U-Boot-Verluste von September 1939 bis Mai 1945 [German U-boat losses from September 1939 to May 1945] (in German). Vol. IV. Hamburg, Berlin, Bonn: Mittler. ISBN 3-8132-0514-2.
- Gröner, Eric; Jung, Dieter; Maass, Martin (1991). German Warships 1815-1945: U-boats and Mine Warfare Vessels. Vol. 2. Translated by Thomas, Keith; Magowan, Rachel. London: Conway Maritime Press. ISBN 0-85177-593-4.
- Niestlé, Axel (2014). German U-Boat Losses During World War II: Details of Destruction. Barnsley, UK: Frontline Books. ISBN 978-1-84832-210-3.
- Wynn, Kenneth (1998). U-Boat Operations of the Second World War: Volume 2: Career Histories, U511–UIT25. London: Chatham Publishing. ISBN 1-86176-069-8.
