= German submarine U-377 =

German world war II submarine

History

Nazi Germany
- Name: U-377
- Ordered: 16 October 1939
- Builder: Howaldtswerke, Kiel
- Yard number: 8
- Laid down: 8 April 1940
- Launched: 15 August 1941
- Commissioned: 2 October 1941
- Fate: Sunk on 17 January 1944

General characteristics
- Class & type: Type VIIC submarine
- Displacement: 769 tonnes (757 long tons) surfaced; 871 t (857 long tons) submerged
- Length: 67.10 m (220 ft 2 in) o/a; 50.50 m (165 ft 8 in) pressure hull
- Beam: 6.20 m (20 ft 4 in) o/a; 4.70 m (15 ft 5 in) pressure hull
- Height: 9.60 m (31 ft 6 in)
- Draught: 4.74 m (15 ft 7 in)
- Installed power: 2,800–3,200 PS (2,100–2,400 kW; 2,800–3,200 bhp) (diesels); 750 PS (550 kW; 740 shp) (electric)
- Propulsion: 2 shafts; 2 × diesel engines; 2 × electric motors
- Speed: 17.7 knots (32.8 km/h; 20.4 mph) surfaced; 7.6 knots (14.1 km/h; 8.7 mph) submerged
- Range: 8,500 nmi (15,700 km; 9,800 mi) at 10 knots (19 km/h; 12 mph) surfaced; 80 nmi (150 km; 92 mi) at 4 knots (7.4 km/h; 4.6 mph) submerged
- Test depth: 230 m (750 ft); Crush depth: 250–295 m (820–968 ft)
- Complement: 4 officers, 40–56 enlisted
- Armament: 5 × 53.3 cm (21 in) torpedo tubes (four bow, one stern); 14 × torpedoes; 1 × 8.8 cm (3.46 in) deck gun (220 rounds); 1 x 2 cm (0.79 in) C/30 AA gun

Service record
- Part of: 6th U-boat Flotilla; 2 October 1941 – 30 June 1942; 11th U-boat Flotilla; 1 July 1942 – 28 February 1943; 9th U-boat Flotilla; 1 March 1943 – 17 January 1944
- Identification codes: M 16 791
- Commanders: Kptlt. Otto Köhler; 2 October 1941 – 2 August 1943; Oblt.z.S. Gerhard Kluth; 3 August 1943 – 17 January 1944; Lt.z.S. Ernst-August Gerke (acting); 22 September – 10 October 1943
- Operations: 11 patrols: 1st patrol: 14 – 28 February 1942; 2nd patrol: a. 6 – 19 March 1942; b. 22 – 25 March 1942; 3rd patrol: 5 – 19 April 1942; 4th patrol: a. 25 – 29 May 1942; b. 31 May – 2 June 1942; 5th patrol: 18 – 25 July 1942; 6th patrol: 30 August – 24 September 1942; 7th patrol: a. 7 – 24 October 1942; b. 27 October – 13 November 1942; c. 15 – 18 November 1942; d. 20 – 25 November 1942; 8th patrol: 30 January – 18 March 1943; 9th patrol: 15 April – 7 June 1943; 10th patrol: a. 26 – 30 August 1943; b. 6 – 7 September 1943; c. 9 – 22 September 1943; d. 22 September – 10 October 1943; 11th patrol: 15 December 1943 – 17 January 1944
- Victories: None

German submarine U-377 was a Type VIIC U-boat of Nazi Germany's Kriegsmarine during World War II. The submarine was laid down on 8 April 1940 at the Howaldtswerke yard in Kiel, launched on 15 August 1941, and commissioned on 2 October 1941 under the command of Kapitänleutnant Otto Köhler.

U-377 was attached to the 6th U-boat Flotilla, and was ready for front-line service from 1 February 1942. She served with the 11th U-boat Flotilla based in Norway from 1 July 1942, and was transferred to the 9th U-boat Flotilla based in France on 1 March 1943. She sailed on 11 war patrols between February 1942 and January 1944, but sank no ships, before she was sunk with the loss of all hands on 17 January 1944 on the position 49°39′N 20°10′W by depth charges from the British destroyer HMS Wanderer and the frigate HMS Glenarm.

== Design ==
German Type VIIC submarines were preceded by the shorter Type VIIB submarines. U-377 had a displacement of 769 tonnes (757 long tons) when at the surface and 871 tonnes (857 long tons) while submerged. She had a total length of 67.10 m (220 ft 2 in), a pressure hull length of 50.50 m (165 ft 8 in), a beam of 6.20 m (20 ft 4 in), a height of 9.60 m (31 ft 6 in), and a draught of 4.74 m (15 ft 7 in). The submarine was powered by two Germaniawerft F46 four-stroke, six-cylinder supercharged diesel engines producing a total of 2,800 to 3,200 metric horsepower (2,060 to 2,350 kW; 2,760 to 3,160 shp) for use while surfaced, two Garbe, Lahmeyer & Co. RP 137/c double-acting electric motors producing a total of 750 metric horsepower (550 kW; 740 shp) for use while submerged. She had two shafts and two 1.23 m (4 ft) propellers. The boat was capable of operating at depths of up to 230 metres (750 ft).

The submarine had a maximum surface speed of 17.7 knots (32.8 km/h; 20.4 mph) and a maximum submerged speed of 7.6 knots (14.1 km/h; 8.7 mph). When submerged, the boat could operate for 80 nautical miles (150 km; 92 mi) at 4 knots (7.4 km/h; 4.6 mph); when surfaced, she could travel 8,500 nautical miles (15,700 km; 9,800 mi) at 10 knots (19 km/h; 12 mph). U-377 was fitted with five 53.3 cm (21 in) torpedo tubes (four fitted at the bow and one at the stern), fourteen torpedoes, one 8.8 cm (3.46 in) SK C/35 naval gun, 220 rounds, and a 2 cm (0.79 in) C/30 anti-aircraft gun. The boat had a complement of between forty-four and sixty.

== Service history ==
=== Norway ===
U-377 sailed from Kiel on 14 February 1942 and patrolled along the coast of Norway before arriving at Narvik on 28 February. This was her home port for the rest of the year, she sailed on a series of six patrols in the Barents Sea, without success.

On 30 January 1943 U-377 left Bergen and sailed out into the Atlantic, patrolling south of Greenland, before arriving at Brest in France on 18 March, having been transferred to the 9th U-boat Flotilla.

=== France ===
U-377 sailed from Brest on 15 April, out into the mid-Atlantic, and patrolled for 54 days, before returning to base on 7 June.

On 2 August 1943 her commander, Otto Köhler, left the boat and was replaced by Oberleutnant zur See Gerhard Kluth. Kluth's first patrol was quite eventful, as her first two attempts were cut short; U-377 sailed from Brest on 26 August 1943, but returned on the 30th; she sailed again on 6 September 1943, returning the next day. Finally she set out again on 9 September, joining other U-boats in mid-Atlantic. On 22 September, the U-boat was attacked by a B-24 Liberator, wounding the commander. The U-boat returned to port under the command of the I WO. Leutnant zur See Ernst-August Gerke.

=== Loss ===
U-377 departed from Brest on 15 December 1943, with Kluth back in command, sailing out into mid-Atlantic. She made her last radio report on 15 January 1944, claiming to have attacked an unidentified search group with homing torpedoes. The BdU ("U-boat Command") expected the U-boat to head back to France on or about 29 January, so when she had failed to arrive by 10 February, she was listed as missing from 4 February 1944. After the war the Allied Assessment Committee were unable to attribute the loss of U-377 to any known anti-submarine attack, and the U-boat was officially recorded as "lost to unknown cause". The Kriegsmarine had received at least two partially corrupted unsigned coded emergency messages around the time of the U-boat's disappearance, leading to a theory that U-377 had been sunk by one of her own Zaunkoenig T-5 acoustic torpedoes. This explanation has been generally accepted post-war. However, an attack by the British destroyer HMS Wanderer and frigate HMS Glenarm at 49°39′N 20°10′W, on 17 January took place two days and about 220 nautical miles (410 km; 250 mi) from U-377's last known position (where she would have been, had she been on course and sailing at the most economical speed, as ordered) and recent research suggests that this was the U-boat's fate.

=== Wolfpacks ===
U-377 took part in 15 wolfpacks, namely:

- Aufnahme (7 – 11 March 1942)
- Blücher (11 – 18 March 1942)
- Bums (6 – 14 April 1942)
- Blutrausch (15 – 17 April 1942)
- Trägertod (12 – 21 September 1942)
- Ritter (11 – 21 February 1943)
- Neptun (22 February – 2 March 1943)
- Amsel (22 April – 3 May 1943)
- Amsel 2 (3 – 6 May 1943)
- Elbe (7 – 10 May 1943)
- Elbe 2 (10 – 14 May 1943)
- Leuthen (15 – 22 September 1943)
- Borkum (24 December 1943 – 3 January 1944)
- Borkum 3 (3 – 13 January 1944)
- Rügen (13 – 17 January 1944)

== Bibliography ==
- Edwards, Bernard (1996). Dönitz and the Wolf Packs - The U-boats at War. Cassell Military Classics. pp. 219, 220. ISBN 0-304-35203-9.
- Gröner, Erich; Jung, Dieter; Maass, Martin (1991). U-boats and Mine Warfare Vessels. German Warships 1815–1945. Vol. 2. Translated by Thomas, Keith; Magowan, Rachel. London: Conway Maritime Press. ISBN 0-85177-593-4.
- Busch, Rainer; Röll, Hans-Joachim (1999). German U-boat commanders of World War II : a biographical dictionary. Translated by Brooks, Geoffrey. London, Annapolis, Md: Greenhill Books, Naval Institute Press. ISBN 1-55750-186-6.
- Busch, Rainer; Röll, Hans-Joachim (1999). Deutsche U-Boot-Verluste von September 1939 bis Mai 1945 [German U-boat losses from September 1939 to May 1945]. Der U-Boot-Krieg (in German). Vol. IV. Hamburg; Berlin; Bonn: Mittler. ISBN 3-8132-0514-2.
