= German submarine U-231 =

German World War II submarine

History

Nazi Germany
- Name: U-231
- Ordered: 7 December 1940
- Builder: Germaniawerft, Kiel
- Yard number: 661
- Laid down: 30 January 1942
- Launched: 1 October 1942
- Commissioned: 14 November 1942
- Fate: Sunk on 13 January 1944

General characteristics
- Class & type: Type VIIC submarine
- Displacement: 769 tonnes (757 long tons) surfaced; 871 t (857 long tons) submerged
- Length: 67.10 m (220 ft 2 in) o/a; 50.50 m (165 ft 8 in) pressure hull
- Beam: 6.20 m (20 ft 4 in) o/a; 4.70 m (15 ft 5 in) pressure hull
- Height: 9.60 m (31 ft 6 in)
- Draught: 4.74 m (15 ft 7 in)
- Installed power: 2,800–3,200 PS (2,100–2,400 kW; 2,800–3,200 bhp) (diesels); 750 PS (550 kW; 740 shp) (electric)
- Propulsion: 2 shafts; 2 × diesel engines; 2 × electric motors
- Speed: 17.7 knots (32.8 km/h; 20.4 mph) surfaced; 7.6 knots (14.1 km/h; 8.7 mph) submerged
- Range: 8,500 nmi (15,700 km; 9,800 mi) at 10 knots (19 km/h; 12 mph) surfaced; 80 nmi (150 km; 92 mi) at 4 knots (7.4 km/h; 4.6 mph) submerged
- Test depth: 230 m (750 ft); Crush depth: 250–295 m (820–968 ft)
- Complement: 4 officers, 40–56 enlisted
- Armament: 5 × 53.3 cm (21 in) torpedo tubes (four bow, one stern); 14 × torpedoes or 26 TMA mines; 1 × 8.8 cm (3.46 in) deck gun(220 rounds); 1 x 2 cm (0.79 in) C/30 AA gun

Service record
- Part of: 5th U-boat Flotilla; 14 November 1942 – 30 April 1943; 3rd U-boat Flotilla; 1 May – 13 January 1944
- Identification codes: M 50 310
- Commanders: Kptlt. Wolfgang Wenzel; 14 November 1942 – 13 January 1944
- Operations: 3 patrols: 1st patrol: a. 13 April – 31 May 1943; b. 27 – 29 July 1943; c. 23 – 24 September 1943; 2nd patrol: 27 September – 22 November 1943; 3rd patrol: 26 December – 13 January 1944
- Victories: None

German submarine U-231 was a Type VIIC U-boat of Nazi Germany's Kriegsmarine during World War II.

The submarine was laid down on 30 January 1942 at the Friedrich Krupp Germaniawerft yard at Kiel as yard number 661, launched on 1 October, and commissioned on 14 November under the command of Kapitänleutnant Wolfgang Wenzel.

After training with the 5th U-boat Flotilla at Kiel, U-231 was transferred to the 3rd U-boat Flotilla on 1 May 1943 which was based at La Pallice in France, for front-line service. In three war patrols, the U-boat sank or damaged no merchant ships. She was a member of eleven wolfpacks.

U-231 was sunk on 13 January 1944 in the North Atlantic northeast of the Azores by a British aircraft.

== Design ==
German Type VIIC submarines were preceded by the shorter Type VIIB submarines. U-231 had a displacement of 769 tonnes (757 long tons) when at the surface and 871 tonnes (857 long tons) while submerged. She had a total length of 67.10 m (220 ft 2 in), a pressure hull length of 50.50 m (165 ft 8 in), a beam of 6.20 m (20 ft 4 in), a height of 9.60 m (31 ft 6 in), and a draught of 4.74 m (15 ft 7 in). The submarine was powered by two Germaniawerft F46 four-stroke, six-cylinder supercharged diesel engines producing a total of 2,800 to 3,200 metric horsepower (2,060 to 2,350 kW; 2,760 to 3,160 shp) for use while surfaced, two AEG GU 460/8–27 double-acting electric motors producing a total of 750 metric horsepower (550 kW; 740 shp) for use while submerged. She had two shafts and two 1.23 m (4 ft) propellers. The boat was capable of operating at depths of up to 230 metres (750 ft).

The submarine had a maximum surface speed of 17.7 knots (32.8 km/h; 20.4 mph) and a maximum submerged speed of 7.6 knots (14.1 km/h; 8.7 mph). When submerged, the boat could operate for 80 nautical miles (150 km; 92 mi) at 4 knots (7.4 km/h; 4.6 mph); when surfaced, she could travel 8,500 nautical miles (15,700 km; 9,800 mi) at 10 knots (19 km/h; 12 mph). U-231 was fitted with five 53.3 cm (21 in) torpedo tubes (four fitted at the bow and one at the stern), fourteen torpedoes, one 8.8 cm (3.46 in) SK C/35 naval gun, 220 rounds, and an anti-aircraft gun. The boat had a complement of between forty-four and sixty.

== Service history ==
=== First patrol ===
U-231 departed Kiel on 13 April 1943. On the 22nd, she was attacked on two occasions by Catalina aircraft of No. 190 Squadron RAF. Both attacks caused no damage, although a man was lost overboard during the first. She was then attacked on the 23rd (twice), the first of which resulted in a flooded conning tower. She was also attacked on 21 May by American Avenger aircraft from the carrier USS Bogue. The result was a chlorine gas leak and both radio transmitters being knocked out and the boat returned La Pallice in occupied France on 31 May.

=== Second patrol ===
This foray commenced from Bordeaux, took her to the middle of the Atlantic Ocean and terminated in La Pallice.

=== Third patrol and loss ===
U-231 was sunk northeast of the Azores by depth charges from a RAF Vickers Wellington of 172 Squadron on 13 January 1944. Seven men died, there were 47 survivors.

=== Wolfpacks ===
U-231 took part in eleven wolfpacks, namely:

- Star (27 April - 4 May 1943)
- Fink (4 – 6 May 1943)
- Elbe (7 – 10 May 1943)
- Elbe 1 (10 – 14 May 1943)
- Mosel (19 – 22 May 1943)
- Schlieffen (14 – 22 October 1943)
- Siegfried (22 – 27 October 1943)
- Siegfried 1 (27 – 30 October 1943)
- Körner (30 October - 2 November 1943)
- Borkum (1 – 3 January 1944)
- Borkum 3 (3 – 13 January 1944)

== Bibliography ==
- Busch, Rainer; Röll, Hans-Joachim (1999). German U-boat commanders of World War II : a biographical dictionary. Translated by Brooks, Geoffrey. London, Annapolis, Md: Greenhill Books, Naval Institute Press. ISBN 1-55750-186-6.
- Busch, Rainer; Röll, Hans-Joachim (1999). Deutsche U-Boot-Verluste von September 1939 bis Mai 1945 [German U-boat losses from September 1939 to May 1945]. Der U-Boot-Krieg (in German). Vol. IV. Hamburg, Berlin, Bonn: Mittler. ISBN 3-8132-0514-2.
- Gröner, Erich; Jung, Dieter; Maass, Martin (1991). U-boats and Mine Warfare Vessels. German Warships 1815–1945. Vol. 2. Translated by Thomas, Keith; Magowan, Rachel. London: Conway Maritime Press. ISBN 0-85177-593-4.
- Kemp, Paul (1999). U-Boats Destroyed - German Submarine Losses in the World Wars. London: Arms & Armour. ISBN 1-85409-515-3.
