= German submarine U-641 =

German World War II submarine

History

Nazi Germany
- Name: U-641
- Ordered: 20 January 1941
- Builder: Blohm & Voss, Hamburg
- Yard number: 617
- Laid down: 19 November 1941
- Launched: 6 August 1942
- Commissioned: 24 September 1942
- Fate: Sunk on 19 January 1944

General characteristics
- Class & type: Type VIIC submarine
- Displacement: 769 tonnes (757 long tons) surfaced; 871 t (857 long tons) submerged
- Length: 67.10 m (220 ft 2 in) o/a; 50.50 m (165 ft 8 in) pressure hull
- Beam: 6.20 m (20 ft 4 in) o/a; 4.70 m (15 ft 5 in) pressure hull
- Height: 9.60 m (31 ft 6 in)
- Draught: 4.74 m (15 ft 7 in)
- Installed power: 2,800–3,200 PS (2,100–2,400 kW; 2,800–3,200 bhp) (diesels); 750 PS (550 kW; 740 shp) (electric)
- Propulsion: 2 shafts; 2 × diesel engines; 2 × electric motors
- Speed: 17.7 knots (32.8 km/h; 20.4 mph) surfaced; 7.6 knots (14.1 km/h; 8.7 mph) submerged
- Range: 8,500 nmi (15,700 km; 9,800 mi) at 10 knots (19 km/h; 12 mph) surfaced; 80 nmi (150 km; 92 mi) at 4 knots (7.4 km/h; 4.6 mph) submerged
- Test depth: 230 m (750 ft); Crush depth: 250–295 m (820–968 ft)
- Complement: 4 officers, 40–56 enlisted
- Armament: 5 × 53.3 cm (21 in) torpedo tubes (4 bow, 1 stern); 14 × torpedoes or 26 TMA mines; 1 × 8.8 cm (3.46 in) deck gun (220 rounds); 1 × twin 2 cm (0.79 in) C/30 anti-aircraft gun

Service record
- Part of: 5th U-boat Flotilla; 24 September 1942 – 28 February 1943; 7th U-boat Flotilla; 1 March 1943 – 19 January 1944
- Identification codes: M 50 387
- Commanders: Oblt.z.S. / Kptlt. Horst Rendtel; 24 September 1942 – 19 January 1944
- Operations: 4 patrols: 1st patrol: 20 February – 12 April 1943; 2nd patrol: 9 May – 16 July 1943; 3rd patrol: a. 31 August – 1 September 1943; b. 4 September – 18 October 1943; 4th patrol: 11 December 1943 – 19 January 1944
- Victories: None

German submarine U-641 was a Type VIIC U-boat built for Nazi Germany's Kriegsmarine for service during World War II. She was laid down on 19 November 1941 by Blohm & Voss, Hamburg as yard number 617, launched on 6 August 1942 and commissioned on 24 September 1942 under Oberleutnant zur See Horst Rendtel.

== Design ==
German Type VIIC submarines were preceded by the shorter Type VIIB submarines. U-641 had a displacement of 769 tonnes (757 long tons) when at the surface and 871 tonnes (857 long tons) while submerged. She had a total length of 67.10 m (220 ft 2 in), a pressure hull length of 50.50 m (165 ft 8 in), a beam of 6.20 m (20 ft 4 in), a height of 9.60 m (31 ft 6 in), and a draught of 4.74 m (15 ft 7 in). The submarine was powered by two Germaniawerft F46 four-stroke, six-cylinder supercharged diesel engines producing a total of 2,800 to 3,200 metric horsepower (2,060 to 2,350 kW; 2,760 to 3,160 shp) for use while surfaced, two BBC GG UB 720/8 double-acting electric motors producing a total of 750 metric horsepower (550 kW; 740 shp) for use while submerged. She had two shafts and two 1.23 m (4 ft) propellers. The boat was capable of operating at depths of up to 230 metres (750 ft).

The submarine had a maximum surface speed of 17.7 knots (32.8 km/h; 20.4 mph) and a maximum submerged speed of 7.6 knots (14.1 km/h; 8.7 mph). When submerged, the boat could operate for 80 nautical miles (150 km; 92 mi) at 4 knots (7.4 km/h; 4.6 mph); when surfaced, she could travel 8,500 nautical miles (15,700 km; 9,800 mi) at 10 knots (19 km/h; 12 mph). U-641 was fitted with five 53.3 cm (21 in) torpedo tubes (four fitted at the bow and one at the stern), fourteen torpedoes, one 8.8 cm (3.46 in) SK C/35 naval gun, 220 rounds, and one twin 2 cm (0.79 in) C/30 anti-aircraft gun. The boat had a complement of between forty-four and sixty.

== Service history ==
The boat's short service career began on 24 September 1942 for training with 5th U-boat Flotilla, followed by active service on 1 March 1943 as part of the 7th U-boat Flotilla. It ended ten months later when she was sunk in the North Atlantic.

In four patrols she sank no ships.

=== Wolfpacks ===
U-641 took part in thirteen wolfpacks, namely:

- Neuland (4 – 6 March 1943)
- Ostmark (6 – 11 March 1943)
- Stürmer (11 – 20 March 1943)
- Seewolf (21 – 30 March 1943)
- Mosel (19 – 24 May 1943)
- Trutz (1 – 16 June 1943)
- Trutz 2 (16 – 29 June 1943)
- Geier 1 (30 June – 14 July 1943)
- Leuthen (15 – 24 September 1943)
- Rossbach (24 September – 9 October 1943)
- Borkum (18 December 1943 – 3 January 1944)
- Borkum 2 (3 – 13 January 1944)
- Rügen (13 – 19 January 1944)

=== Fate ===
U-641 was sunk on 19 January 1944 in the North Atlantic in position 50°25′N 18°49′W; depth charged by Royal Navy corvette HMS Violet. There were no survivors.

== Bibliography ==
- Busch, Rainer; Röll, Hans-Joachim (1999). German U-boat commanders of World War II : a biographical dictionary. Translated by Brooks, Geoffrey. London, Annapolis, Md: Greenhill Books, Naval Institute Press. ISBN 1-55750-186-6.
- Edwards, Bernard (1996). Dönitz and the Wolf Packs - The U-boats at War. pp. 137, 138, 167–169. ISBN 0-304-35203-9.
- Gröner, Eric; Jung, Dieter; Maass, Martin (1991). German Warships 1815-1945: U-boats and Mine Warfare Vessels. Vol. 2. Translated by Thomas, Keith; Magowan, Rachel. London: Conway Maritime Press. ISBN 0-85177-593-4.
- Kemp, Paul (1997). U-Boats Destroyed – German Submarine Losses in the World Wars. Arms and Armour Press. ISBN 1-85409-321-5.
- Sharpe, Peter (1998). U-Boat Fact File. Great Britain: Midland Publishing. ISBN 1-85780-072-9.
