= German submarine U-384 =

German World War II submarine

History

Nazi Germany
- Name: U-384
- Ordered: 15 August 1940
- Builder: Howaldtswerke, Kiel
- Yard number: 15
- Laid down: 29 March 1941
- Launched: 28 May 1942
- Commissioned: 18 July 1942
- Fate: Sunk on 19 March 1943

General characteristics
- Class & type: Type VIIC submarine
- Displacement: 769 tonnes (757 long tons) surfaced; 871 t (857 long tons) submerged
- Length: 67.10 m (220 ft 2 in) o/a; 50.50 m (165 ft 8 in) pressure hull
- Beam: 6.20 m (20 ft 4 in) o/a; 4.70 m (15 ft 5 in) pressure hull
- Height: 9.60 m (31 ft 6 in)
- Draught: 4.74 m (15 ft 7 in)
- Installed power: 2,800–3,200 PS (2,100–2,400 kW; 2,800–3,200 bhp) (diesels); 750 PS (550 kW; 740 shp) (electric)
- Propulsion: 2 shafts; 2 × diesel engines; 2 × electric motors.
- Speed: 17.7 knots (32.8 km/h; 20.4 mph) surfaced; 7.6 knots (14.1 km/h; 8.7 mph) submerged
- Range: 8,500 nmi (15,700 km; 9,800 mi) at 10 knots (19 km/h; 12 mph) surfaced; 80 nmi (150 km; 92 mi) at 4 knots (7.4 km/h; 4.6 mph) submerged
- Test depth: 230 m (750 ft); Crush depth: 250–295 m (820–968 ft)
- Complement: 4 officers, 40–56 enlisted
- Armament: 5 × 53.3 cm (21 in) torpedo tubes (four bow, one stern); 14 × torpedoes; 1 × 8.8 cm (3.46 in) deck gun (220 rounds); 2 × twin 2 cm (0.79 in) C/30 anti-aircraft guns

Service record
- Part of: 5th U-boat Flotilla; 18 July – 31 December 1942; 3rd U-boat Flotilla; 1 January – 19 March 1943
- Identification codes: M 30 536
- Commanders: Oblt.z.S. Hans-Achim von Rosenberg-Gruszcynski; 18 July 1942 – 19 March 1943
- Operations: 2 patrols: 1st patrol: 12 December 1942 – 3 February 1943; 2nd patrol: 6 – 19 March 1943
- Victories: 2 merchant ships sunk (13,407 GRT)

German submarine U-384 was a Type VIIC U-boat of Nazi Germany's Kriegsmarine during World War II.

She carried out two patrols and sank one ship on each patrol. She was a member of three wolfpacks. On her second patrol, she was sunk by a British aircraft southwest of Iceland on 19 March 1943.

== Design ==
German Type VIIC submarines were preceded by the shorter Type VIIB submarines. U-384 had a displacement of 769 tonnes (757 long tons) when at the surface and 871 tonnes (857 long tons) while submerged. She had a total length of 67.10 m (220 ft 2 in), a pressure hull length of 50.50 m (165 ft 8 in), a beam of 6.20 m (20 ft 4 in), a height of 9.60 m (31 ft 6 in), and a draught of 4.74 m (15 ft 7 in). The submarine was powered by two Germaniawerft F46 four-stroke, six-cylinder supercharged diesel engines producing a total of 2,800 to 3,200 metric horsepower (2,060 to 2,350 kW; 2,760 to 3,160 shp) for use while surfaced, two Garbe, Lahmeyer & Co. RP 137/c double-acting electric motors producing a total of 750 metric horsepower (550 kW; 740 shp) for use while submerged. She had two shafts and two 1.23 m (4 ft) propellers. The boat was capable of operating at depths of up to 230 metres (750 ft).

The submarine had a maximum surface speed of 17.7 knots (32.8 km/h; 20.4 mph) and a maximum submerged speed of 7.6 knots (14.1 km/h; 8.7 mph). When submerged, the boat could operate for 80 nautical miles (150 km; 92 mi) at 4 knots (7.4 km/h; 4.6 mph); when surfaced, she could travel 8,500 nautical miles (15,700 km; 9,800 mi) at 10 knots (19 km/h; 12 mph). U-384 was fitted with five 53.3 cm (21 in) torpedo tubes (four fitted at the bow and one at the stern), fourteen torpedoes, one 8.8 cm (3.46 in) SK C/35 naval gun, 220 rounds, and two twin 2 cm (0.79 in) C/30 anti-aircraft guns. The boat had a complement of between forty-four and sixty.

== Service history ==
The submarine was laid down on 29 March 1941 at the Howaldtswerke at Kiel as yard number 15, launched on 28 May 1942 and commissioned on 18 July under the command of Oberleutnant zur See Hans-Achim von Rosenberg-Gruszcynski.

She served with the 5th U-boat Flotilla from 18 July 1942 and the 3rd flotilla from 1 January 1943.

=== First patrol ===
U-359's first patrol took her from Kiel in Germany on 12 December 1942. She sank the Louise Lykes in mid-Atlantic on 9 January 1943. She then docked at La Pallice in occupied France on 3 February.

=== Second patrol and loss ===
Having left La Pallice on 6 March 1943, she sank the Coracero on 17 March. On 19 March, she was sunk by a British Boeing B-17 Flying Fortress of No. 206 Squadron RAF.

47 men died in the U-boat; there were no survivors.

=== Previously recorded fate ===
U-361 was originally noted as sunk on 20 March 1943 by a British Sunderland flying boat of 201 Squadron. This attack was against U-631. No damage was sustained.

=== Wolfpacks ===
U-384 took part in three wolfpacks, namely:

- Falke (28 December 1942 – 19 January 1943)
- Landsknecht (19 – 26 January 1943)
- Stürmer (11 – 19 March 1943)

== Summary of raiding history ==
Date	Ship Name	Nationality	Tonnage (GRT)	Fate
9 January 1943	Louise Lykes	United States	6,155	Sunk
17 March 1943	Coracero	United Kingdom	7,252	Sunk

== Bibliography ==
- Busch, Rainer; Röll, Hans-Joachim (1999). German U-boat commanders of World War II : a biographical dictionary. Translated by Brooks, Geoffrey. London, Annapolis, Md: Greenhill Books, Naval Institute Press. ISBN 1-55750-186-6.
- Busch, Rainer; Röll, Hans-Joachim (1999). Deutsche U-Boot-Verluste von September 1939 bis Mai 1945 [German U-boat losses from September 1939 to May 1945]. Der U-Boot-Krieg (in German). Vol. IV. Hamburg, Berlin, Bonn: Mittler. ISBN 3-8132-0514-2.
- Gröner, Erich; Jung, Dieter; Maass, Martin (1991). U-boats and Mine Warfare Vessels. German Warships 1815–1945. Vol. 2. Translated by Thomas, Keith; Magowan, Rachel. London: Conway Maritime Press. ISBN 0-85177-593-4.
- Kemp, Paul (1999). U-Boats Destroyed - German Submarine Losses in the World Wars. London: Arms & Armour. ISBN 1-85409-515-3.
