= Wolfpack Leuthen =

Wolf pack Leuthen
- Active: 15 Sep 1943 - 24 Sep 1943
- Country: Nazi Germany
- Branch: Kriegsmarine
- Size: 20 submarines

Commanders
- Notable commanders: Siegfried Freiherr von Forstner

Leuthen was the given name to a wolfpack of German U-boats that operated during the World War II Battle of the Atlantic in 1943 from 15 to 24 September 1943

== Service history ==
Leuthen was formed in September 1943 and was established to renew the attack on the North Atlantic route. Following the defeats of May 1943, and the devastating losses incurred by the U-boat Arm (U-Bootwaffe, UBW) then, Admiral Dönitz had withdrawn from attacks on the North Atlantic route while awaiting tactical and technical improvements. By September 1943 these were ready.

Leuthen operated against convoys ONS 18 and ON 202, which were travelling together; U-boats from Leuthen sank 6 ships of 36,442 GRT and 3 escorts in this battle, but lost 3 boats ( U-229, U-338, and U-341) destroyed, and 3 forced to return with damage, in attacks by aircraft and surface vessels.

Leuthen was disbanded after this assault, at the end of September; of the remaining 15 boats, 3 returned to base and 12 formed the core of a new patrol line, code-named Rossbach.

=== Raiding History ===
| Date | U-boat | Commander | Name of ship | Nationality | Tons | Convoy | Fate |
|---|---|---|---|---|---|---|---|
| 20 September 1943 | U-238 | Horst Hepp | Frederick Douglass | United States | 7,176 | ON 202 | Damaged |
| 20 September 1943 | U-645 | Otto Ferro | Frederick Douglass | United States | 7,176 | ON 202 | Sunk |
| 20 September 1943 | U-305 | Rudolf Bahr | HMCS St. Croix | Royal Canadian Navy | 1,190 | ON 202 | Sunk |
| 20 September 1943 | U-270 | Paul-Friedrich Otto | HMS Lagan | Royal Navy | 1,370 | ON 202 | Total loss |
| 20 September 1943 | U-238 | Horst Hepp | Theodore Dwight Weld | United States | 7,176 | ON 202 | Sunk |
| 21 September 1943 | U-952 | Oskar Curio | HMS Polyanthus | Royal Navy | 925 | ON 202 | Sunk |
| 23 September 1943 | U-238 | Horst Hepp | Fort Jemseg | United Kingdom | 7,134 | ON 202 | Sunk |
| 23 September 1943 | U-666 | Herbert Engel | HMS Itchen | Royal Navy | 1,370 | ON 202 | Sunk |
| 23 September 1943 | U-952 | Oskar Curio | James Gordon Bennett | United States | 7,176 | ON 202 | Damaged |
| 23 September 1943 | U-238 | Horst Hepp | Oregon Express | Norway | 3,642 | ON 202 | Sunk |
| 23 September 1943 | U-238 | Horst Hepp | Skjelbred | Norway | 5,096 | ON 202 | Sunk |
| 23 September 1943 | U-952 | Oskar Curio | Steel Voyager | United States | 6,198 | ON 202 | Sunk |

=== U-boats ===
| U-boat | Commander | From | To | Notes |
|---|---|---|---|---|
| U-229 | Robert Schetelig | 15 September 1943 | 23 September 1943 | Destroyed; depth-charge, gunfire and ramming by HMS Keppel |
| U-238 | Horst Hepp | 15 September 1943 | 24 September 1943 | Returned to base |
| U-260 | Hubertus Purkhold | 15 September 1943 | 24 September 1943 | to group Rossbach |
| U-270 | Paul-Friedrich Otto | 15 September 1943 | 23 September 1943 | Returned to base |
| U-275 | Helmut Bork | 15 September 1943 | 24 September 1943 | to group Rossbach |
| U-305 | Rudolf Bahr | 15 September 1943 | 24 September 1943 | to group Rossbach |
| U-338 | Manfred Kinzel | 15 September 1943 | 20 September 1943 | Destroyed; Liberator F/120Sqdn, HMCS Drumheller |
| U-341 | Dietrich Epp | 15 September 1943 | 19 September 1943 | Destroyed; depth-charge by Liberator A/10Sqdn RCAF |
| U-377 | Gerhard Kluth | 15 September 1943 | 22 September 1943 | Returned to base |
| U-378 | Erich Mäder | 15 September 1943 | 24 September 1943 | to group Rossbach |
| U-386 | Fritz Albrecht | 15 September 1943 | 21 September 1943 | Returned to base |
| U-402 | Siegfried von Forstner | 15 September 1943 | 24 September 1943 | to group Rossbach |
| U-422 | Wolfgang Poeschel | 15 September 1943 | 24 September 1943 | Returned to base; destroyed en route 4 October 1943 |
| U-584 | Joachim Deecke | 15 September 1943 | 24 September 1943 | to group Rossbach |
| U-603 | Rudolf Baltz | 15 September 1943 | 24 September 1943 | to group Rossbach |
| U-641 | Horst Rendtel | 15 September 1943 | 24 September 1943 | to group Rossbach |
| U-645 | Otto Ferro | 15 September 1943 | 24 September 1943 | to group Rossbach |
| U-666 | Herbert Engel | 15 September 1943 | 24 September 1943 | to group Rossbach |
| U-731 | Werner Techand | 15 September 1943 | 24 September 1943 | to group Rossbach |
| U-758 | Helmut Manseck | 15 September 1943 | 24 September 1943 | to group Rossbach |
| U-952 | Oskar Curio | 15 September 1943 | 24 September 1943 | to group Rossbach |

== The name ==
The name "Leuthen" was a reference to the battle of Leuthen fought by Frederick the Great during the Seven Years' War.

== Bibliography ==
- Showell, Jak P M (2002). U-Boat Warfare: The Evolution of the Wolf-Pack. Ian Allan. ISBN 0-7110-2887-7.
