= German submarine U-422 =

German World War II submarine

History

Nazi Germany
- Name: U-422
- Ordered: 10 April 1941
- Builder: Danziger Werft, Danzig
- Yard number: 123
- Laid down: 11 February 1942
- Launched: 10 October 1942
- Commissioned: 10 February 1943
- Fate: Sunk by an American aircraft north of the Azores on 4 October 1943

General characteristics
- Class & type: Type VIIC submarine
- Displacement: 769 tonnes (757 long tons) surfaced; 871 t (857 long tons) submerged
- Length: 67.10 m (220 ft 2 in) o/a; 50.50 m (165 ft 8 in) pressure hull
- Beam: 6.20 m (20 ft 4 in) o/a; 4.70 m (15 ft 5 in) pressure hull
- Height: 9.60 m (31 ft 6 in)
- Draught: 4.74 m (15 ft 7 in)
- Installed power: 2,800–3,200 PS (2,100–2,400 kW; 2,800–3,200 bhp) (diesels); 750 PS (550 kW; 740 shp) (electric)
- Propulsion: 2 shafts; 2 × diesel engines; 2 × electric motors.
- Speed: 17.7 knots (32.8 km/h; 20.4 mph) surfaced; 7.6 knots (14.1 km/h; 8.7 mph) submerged
- Range: 8,500 nmi (15,700 km; 9,800 mi) at 10 knots (19 km/h; 12 mph) surfaced; 80 nmi (150 km; 92 mi) at 4 knots (7.4 km/h; 4.6 mph) submerged
- Test depth: 230 m (750 ft); Crush depth: 250–295 m (820–968 ft)
- Complement: 4 officers, 40–56 enlisted
- Armament: 5 × 53.3 cm (21 in) torpedo tubes (four bow, one stern); 14 × torpedoes; 1 × 8.8 cm (3.46 in) deck gun (220 rounds); 2 × twin 2 cm (0.79 in) C/30 anti-aircraft guns

Service record
- Part of: 8th U-boat Flotilla; 10 February – 31 July 1943; 1st U-boat Flotilla; 1 August – 4 October 1943
- Identification codes: M 50 330
- Commanders: Oblt.z.S. Wolfgang Poeschel; 10 February – 4 October 1943
- Operations: 1 patrol: 8 September – 4 October 1943
- Victories: None

German submarine U-422 was a Type VIIC U-boat of Nazi Germany's Kriegsmarine during World War II.

She carried out one patrol. She was a member of one wolfpack. She did not sink or damage any ships.

She was sunk by an American aircraft north of the Azores on 4 October 1943.

== Design ==
German Type VIIC submarines were preceded by the shorter Type VIIB submarines. U-422 had a displacement of 769 tonnes (757 long tons) when at the surface and 871 tonnes (857 long tons) while submerged. She had a total length of 67.10 m (220 ft 2 in), a pressure hull length of 50.50 m (165 ft 8 in), a beam of 6.20 m (20 ft 4 in), a height of 9.60 m (31 ft 6 in), and a draught of 4.74 m (15 ft 7 in). The submarine was powered by two Germaniawerft F46 four-stroke, six-cylinder supercharged diesel engines producing a total of 2,800 to 3,200 metric horsepower (2,060 to 2,350 kW; 2,760 to 3,160 shp) for use while surfaced, two Siemens-Schuckert GU 343/38–8 double-acting electric motors producing a total of 750 metric horsepower (550 kW; 740 shp) for use while submerged. She had two shafts and two 1.23 m (4 ft) propellers. The boat was capable of operating at depths of up to 230 metres (750 ft).

The submarine had a maximum surface speed of 17.7 knots (32.8 km/h; 20.4 mph) and a maximum submerged speed of 7.6 knots (14.1 km/h; 8.7 mph). When submerged, the boat could operate for 80 nautical miles (150 km; 92 mi) at 4 knots (7.4 km/h; 4.6 mph); when surfaced, she could travel 8,500 nautical miles (15,700 km; 9,800 mi) at 10 knots (19 km/h; 12 mph). U-422 was fitted with five 53.3 cm (21 in) torpedo tubes (four fitted at the bow and one at the stern), fourteen torpedoes, one 8.8 cm (3.46 in) SK C/35 naval gun, 220 rounds, and two twin 2 cm (0.79 in) C/30 anti-aircraft guns. The boat had a complement of between forty-four and sixty.

== Service history ==
The submarine was laid down on 11 February 1942 at the Danziger Werft (yard) at Danzig (now Gdansk), as yard number 123, launched on 10 October and commissioned on 10 February 1943 under the command of Oberleutnant zur See Wolfgang Poeschel.

She served with the 8th U-boat Flotilla from 10 February 1943 and the 1st flotilla from 1 August 1943.

=== Patrol and loss ===
The boat's only patrol was preceded by a trip from Kiel in Germany to Bergen in Norway. U-422 then left Bergen on 8 September 1943 and headed for the Atlantic Ocean via the gap between Iceland and the Faroe Islands. U-422 was depth charged and strafed by what was reported as a Handley Page Halifax on the 23rd. Three men were wounded, two of them seriously. Medical assistance could only be given when the submarine rendezvoused with U-460, a 'milch cow' supply vessel.

On 4 October, she was attacked and sunk by a FIDO homing torpedo dropped by an American TBM Avenger which was accompanied by a F4F Wildcat. Both aircraft had come from the escort carrier USS Card.

Forty-nine men went down with the U-boat; there were no survivors.

=== Wolfpacks ===
U-422 took part in one wolfpack, namely:

- Leuthen (15 – 24 September 1943)

== Bibliography ==
- Busch, Rainer; Röll, Hans-Joachim (1999). German U-boat commanders of World War II : a biographical dictionary. Translated by Brooks, Geoffrey. London, Annapolis, Md: Greenhill Books, Naval Institute Press. ISBN 1-55750-186-6.
- Busch, Rainer; Röll, Hans-Joachim (1999). Deutsche U-Boot-Verluste von September 1939 bis Mai 1945 [German U-boat losses from September 1939 to May 1945]. Der U-Boot-Krieg (in German). Vol. IV. Hamburg, Berlin, Bonn: Mittler. ISBN 3-8132-0514-2.
- Gröner, Erich; Jung, Dieter; Maass, Martin (1991). U-boats and Mine Warfare Vessels. German Warships 1815–1945. Vol. 2. Translated by Thomas, Keith; Magowan, Rachel. London: Conway Maritime Press. ISBN 0-85177-593-4.
- Kemp, Paul (1999). U-Boats Destroyed – German Submarine Losses in the World Wars. London: Arms & Armour. ISBN 1-85409-515-3.
