= German submarine U-270 =

German World War II submarine

History

Nazi Germany
- Name: U-270
- Ordered: 20 January 1941
- Builder: Bremer-Vulkan-Vegesacker Werft, Bremen
- Yard number: 35
- Laid down: 15 October 1941
- Launched: 11 July 1942
- Commissioned: 5 September 1942
- Fate: Sunk on 13 August 1944 in the Bay of Biscay, by an Australian aircraft

General characteristics
- Class & type: Type VIIC submarine
- Displacement: 769 metric tons (757 long tons; 848 short tons) surfaced; 871 t (857 long tons; 960 short tons) submerged
- Length: 67.10 m (220 ft 2 in) o/a; 50.50 m (165 ft 8 in) pressure hull
- Beam: 6.20 m (20 ft 4 in) o/a; 4.70 m (15 ft 5 in) pressure hull
- Height: 9.60 m (31 ft 6 in)
- Draught: 4.74 m (15 ft 7 in)
- Installed power: 2,800–3,200 PS (2,100–2,400 kW; 2,800–3,200 bhp) (diesels); 750 PS (550 kW; 740 shp) (electric)
- Propulsion: 2 shafts; 2 × diesel engines; 2 × electric motors
- Speed: 17.7 knots (32.8 km/h; 20.4 mph) surfaced; 7.6 knots (14.1 km/h; 8.7 mph) submerged
- Range: 8,500 nmi (15,700 km; 9,800 mi) at 10 knots (19 km/h; 12 mph) surfaced; 80 nmi (150 km; 92 mi) at 4 knots (7.4 km/h; 4.6 mph) submerged
- Test depth: 230 m (750 ft); Crush depth: 250–295 m (820–968 ft)
- Complement: 4 officers, 40–56 enlisted
- Armament: 5 × 53.3 cm (21 in) torpedo tubes (four bow, one stern); 14 × torpedoes or 26 × TMA or 39 × TMB tube-launched mines; 1 × 8.8 cm (3.46 in) deck gun (220 rounds); 2 × 20 mm AA (4,380 rounds)

Service record
- Part of: 8th U-boat Flotilla; 5 September 1942 – 31 March 1943; 6th U-boat Flotilla; 1 April 1943 – 13 August 1944
- Identification codes: M 50 815
- Commanders: Kptlt. Paul-Frederich Otto; 5 September 1942 – 25 June 1944; Oblt.z.S. Heinrich Schreiber; 16 July – 13 August 1944
- Operations: 6 patrols: 1st patrol: 23 March – 15 May 1943; 2nd patrol: a. 26 June – 2 July 1943; b. 24 – 25 July 1943; 3rd patrol: 7 September – 6 October 1943; 4th patrol: 8 December 1943 – 17 January 1944; 5th patrol: 6 – 17 June 1944; 6th patrol: 10 – 13 August 1944
- Victories: 1 warship total loss (1,370 tons)

German submarine U-270 was a Type VIIC U-boat of Nazi Germany's Kriegsmarine during World War II. The submarine was laid down on 15 October 1941 at the Bremer-Vulkan-Vegesacker Werft (yard) in Bremen as yard number 35. She was launched on 11 July 1942 and commissioned on 5 September under the command of Oberleutnant zur See Paul-Fredrich Otto.

In six patrols, she caused one British warship of 1370 tons to be declared a total loss. She was a member of seven wolfpacks.

She was sunk on 13 August 1944 in the Bay of Biscay by an Australian aircraft.

== Design ==
German Type VIIC submarines were preceded by the shorter Type VIIB submarines. U-270 had a displacement of 769 tonnes (757 long tons) when at the surface and 871 tonnes (857 long tons) while submerged. She had a total length of 67.10 m (220 ft 2 in), a pressure hull length of 50.50 m (165 ft 8 in), a beam of 6.20 m (20 ft 4 in), a height of 9.60 m (31 ft 6 in), and a draught of 4.74 m (15 ft 7 in). The submarine was powered by two Germaniawerft F46 four-stroke, six-cylinder supercharged diesel engines producing a total of 2,800 to 3,200 metric horsepower (2,060 to 2,350 kW; 2,760 to 3,160 shp) for use while surfaced, two AEG GU 460/8–27 double-acting electric motors producing a total of 750 metric horsepower (550 kW; 740 shp) for use while submerged. She had two shafts and two 1.23 m (4 ft) propellers. The boat was capable of operating at depths of up to 230 metres (750 ft).

The submarine had a maximum surface speed of 17.7 knots (32.8 km/h; 20.4 mph) and a maximum submerged speed of 7.6 knots (14.1 km/h; 8.7 mph). When submerged, the boat could operate for 80 nautical miles (150 km; 92 mi) at 4 knots (7.4 km/h; 4.6 mph); when surfaced, she could travel 8,500 nautical miles (15,700 km; 9,800 mi) at 10 knots (19 km/h; 12 mph). U-270 was fitted with five 53.3 cm (21 in) torpedo tubes (four fitted at the bow and one at the stern), fourteen torpedoes, one 8.8 cm (3.46 in) SK C/35 naval gun, 220 rounds, and one twin 2 cm (0.79 in) C/30 anti-aircraft guns. The boat had a complement of between forty-four and sixty.

== Service history ==
After training with the 8th U-boat Flotilla, the boat became operational on 1 April 1943 when she was transferred to the 6th flotilla.

=== First and second patrols ===
U-270's first patrol began when she departed Kiel on 23 March 1943. She entered the Atlantic Ocean after negotiating the gap between Iceland and the Faroe Islands. Two crew members were injured in bad weather on 4 April. She then docked at the French Atlantic port of St. Nazaire on 15 May.

For her second sortie, the boat moved through the Atlantic waters off northwest Spain.

=== Third and fourth patrols ===
She attacked the British frigate HMS Lagan which caused the warship to be declared a total loss. During an attack on a convoy in mid-Atlantic, the boat's pressure hull was cracked by depth charges dropped by the escorts; the submarine was forced to return to base.

U-270 was attacked by a British B-17 Flying Fortress on 6 January 1944 and succeeded in shooting the aircraft down, but not before sufficient damage was caused to force the U-boat to curtail the patrol.

=== Fifth patrol ===
The submarine was returning to base after being attacked and badly damaged by a Vickers Wellington of No. 172 Squadron RAF, when she was attacked by a second bomber, this time from 53 Squadron. This B-24 was also shot down, but did not cause any further damage to the boat. Among the casualties here were Bert Peters, a former Victorian Football League player.

=== Sixth patrol and loss ===
U-270 departed Lorient for the last time on 10 August 1944. In the Bay of Biscay, she was attacked and sunk by an Australian Sunderland flying boat of No. 461 Squadron RAAF on the 13th.

There were no deaths; seventy-one men survived. The German version of U 270 reports of 10 men dead and 71 survived; the boat was overloaded with staff, being evacuated. U 270

=== Wolfpacks ===
U-270 took part in seven wolfpacks, namely:

- Löwenherz (4 – 10 April 1943)
- Lerche (10 – 16 April 1943)
- Specht (21 April – 4 May 1943)
- Fink (4 – 5 May 1943)
- Leuthen (15 – 23 September 1943)
- Borkum (18 December 1943 – 3 January 1944)
- Borkum 1 (3 – 6 January 1944)

== Summary of raiding history ==
Date	Name	Nationality	Tonnage (Note: Merchant ship tonnages are in gross register tons. Military vessels are listed by tons displacement.)	Fate
20 September 1943	HMS Lagan	Royal Navy	1,370	Total loss

== Bibliography ==
- Busch, Rainer; Röll, Hans-Joachim (1999). German U-boat commanders of World War II : a biographical dictionary. Translated by Brooks, Geoffrey. London, Annapolis, Md: Greenhill Books, Naval Institute Press. ISBN 1-55750-186-6.
- Busch, Rainer; Röll, Hans-Joachim (1999). Der U-Boot-Krieg, 1939-1945: Deutsche U-Boot-Verluste von September 1939 bis Mai 1945 [German U-boat losses from September 1939 to May 1945] (in German). Vol. IV. Hamburg, Berlin, Bonn: Mittler. ISBN 3-8132-0514-2.
- Edwards, Bernard (1996). Dönitz and the Wolf Packs - The U-boats at War. Cassell Military Classics. pp. 216, 217, 219, 220. ISBN 0-304-35203-9.
- Gröner, Erich; Jung, Dieter; Maass, Martin (1991). U-boats and Mine Warfare Vessels. German Warships 1815–1945. Vol. 2. Translated by Thomas, Keith; Magowan, Rachel. London: Conway Maritime Press. ISBN 0-85177-593-4.
- Kemp, Paul (1999). U-Boats Destroyed - German Submarine Losses in the World Wars. London: Arms & Armour. ISBN 1-85409-515-3.
