= German submarine U-305 =

German World War II submarine

History

Nazi Germany
- Name: U-305
- Ordered: 20 January 1941
- Builder: Flender Werke, Lübeck
- Yard number: 305
- Laid down: 30 August 1941
- Launched: 25 July 1942
- Commissioned: 17 September 1942
- Fate: Sunk in the North Atlantic on 16 January 1944, probably by its own torpedo

General characteristics
- Class & type: Type VIIC submarine
- Displacement: 769 tonnes (757 long tons) surfaced; 871 t (857 long tons) submerged
- Length: 67.10 m (220 ft 2 in) o/a; 50.50 m (165 ft 8 in) pressure hull
- Beam: 6.20 m (20 ft 4 in) o/a; 4.70 m (15 ft 5 in) pressure hull
- Height: 9.60 m (31 ft 6 in)
- Draught: 4.74 m (15 ft 7 in)
- Installed power: 2,800–3,200 PS (2,100–2,400 kW; 2,800–3,200 bhp) (diesels); 750 PS (550 kW; 740 shp) (electric)
- Propulsion: 2 shafts; 2 × diesel engines; 2 × electric motors
- Speed: 17.7 knots (32.8 km/h; 20.4 mph) surfaced; 7.6 knots (14.1 km/h; 8.7 mph) submerged
- Range: 8,500 nmi (15,700 km; 9,800 mi) at 10 knots (19 km/h; 12 mph) surfaced; 80 nmi (150 km; 92 mi) at 4 knots (7.4 km/h; 4.6 mph) submerged
- Test depth: 230 m (750 ft); Crush depth: 250–295 m (820–968 ft)
- Complement: 4 officers, 40–56 enlisted
- Armament: 5 × 53.3 cm (21 in) torpedo tubes (four bow, one stern); 14 × torpedoes or 26 TMA mines; 1 × 8.8 cm (3.46 in) deck gun (220 rounds); 2 × twin 2 cm (0.79 in) C/30 anti-aircraft guns

Service record
- Part of: 8th U-boat Flotilla; 17 September 1942 – 28 February 1943; 1st U-boat Flotilla; 1 March 1943 – 16 January 1944
- Identification codes: M 49 638
- Commanders: Oblt.z.S. / Kptlt. Rudolf Bahr; 17 September 1942 – 16 January 1944
- Operations: 4 patrols: 1st patrol: 27 February – 12 April 1943; 2nd patrol: 12 May – 1 June 1943; 3rd patrol: 23 August – 22 October 1943; 4th patrol: 8 December – 16 January 1944
- Victories: 2 merchant ships sunk (13,045 GRT); 2 warships sunk (2,560 tons)

German submarine U-305 was a Type VIIC U-boat of Nazi Germany's Kriegsmarine during World War II. The submarine was laid down on 30 August 1941 at the Flender Werke yard at Lübeck as yard number 305, launched on 25 July 1942 and commissioned on 17 September under the command of Oberleutnant zur See Rudolf Bahr.

During her career, the U-boat sailed on four combat patrols, sinking four ships, before she was sunk on 16 January 1944 in mid-Atlantic, southwest of Ireland.

She was part of eight wolfpacks.

== Design ==
German Type VIIC submarines were preceded by the shorter Type VIIB submarines. U-305 had a displacement of 769 tonnes (757 long tons) when at the surface and 871 tonnes (857 long tons) while submerged. She had a total length of 67.10 m (220 ft 2 in), a pressure hull length of 50.50 m (165 ft 8 in), a beam of 6.20 m (20 ft 4 in), a height of 9.60 m (31 ft 6 in), and a draught of 4.74 m (15 ft 7 in). The submarine was powered by two Germaniawerft F46 four-stroke, six-cylinder supercharged diesel engines producing a total of 2,800 to 3,200 metric horsepower (2,060 to 2,350 kW; 2,760 to 3,160 shp) for use while surfaced, two Garbe, Lahmeyer & Co. RP 137/c double-acting electric motors producing a total of 750 metric horsepower (550 kW; 740 shp) for use while submerged. She had two shafts and two 1.23 m (4 ft) propellers. The boat was capable of operating at depths of up to 230 metres (750 ft).

The submarine had a maximum surface speed of 17.7 knots (32.8 km/h; 20.4 mph) and a maximum submerged speed of 7.6 knots (14.1 km/h; 8.7 mph). When submerged, the boat could operate for 80 nautical miles (150 km; 92 mi) at 4 knots (7.4 km/h; 4.6 mph); when surfaced, she could travel 8,500 nautical miles (15,700 km; 9,800 mi) at 10 knots (19 km/h; 12 mph). U-305 was fitted with five 53.3 cm (21 in) torpedo tubes (four fitted at the bow and one at the stern), fourteen torpedoes, one 8.8 cm (3.46 in) SK C/35 naval gun, 220 rounds, and two twin 2 cm (0.79 in) C/30 anti-aircraft guns. The boat had a complement of between forty-four and sixty.

== Service history ==
The boat's service life began with training with the 8th U-boat Flotilla in September 1942. She was then transferred to the 1st flotilla for operations on 1 March.

=== First patrol ===
The submarine's first patrol began with her departure from Kiel on 27 February 1943. She passed through the gap between Iceland and the Faroe Islands and into the north Atlantic Ocean. On 17 March she sank Port Auckland and Zouave southeast of Cape Farewell (Greenland), the latter foundering in five minutes. The boat arrived in Brest in occupied France, on 12 April 1943.

=== Second and third patrols ===
U-305's second foray was relatively uneventful, starting and finishing in Brest, as would all her remaining patrols, on 12 May and 1 June 1943.

On her third sortie, she sank HMCS St. Croix on 20 September 1943. The Canadian warship was one of the first victims of a GNAT acoustic torpedo.

=== Fourth patrol and loss ===
The boat's final patrol commenced on 8 December 1943. She successfully attacked HMS Tweed southwest of Ireland. This ship sank in just two minutes, with the loss of 83 men. HMS Nene picked up 44 survivors.

U-305 was lost in January 1944. Fifty-one men died; there were no survivors.

U-305 was originally thought to have been sunk by the British destroyer HMS Wanderer and the frigate HMS Glenarm at 49°00′N 18°00′W on 17 January 1944. but recent research suggests this attack sank U-377, and U-305 was lost by unknown cause, possibly a victim of one of her own torpedoes.

=== Wolfpacks ===
U-305 took part in eight wolfpacks, namely:

- Stürmer (11 – 20 March 1943)
- Seewolf (21 – 30 March 1943)
- Mosel (19 – 23 May 1943)
- Leuthen (15 – 24 September 1943)
- Rossbach (25 September – 5 October 1943)
- Borkum (18 December 1943 – 3 January 1944)
- Borkum 1 (3 – 13 January 1944)
- Rügen (13 – 16 January 1944)

== Summary of raiding history ==
Date	Ship name	Nationality	Tonnage (Note: Merchant ship tonnages are in gross register tons. Military vessels are listed by tons displacement.)	Fate
17 March 1943	Port Auckland	United Kingdom	8,789	Sunk
17 March 1943	Zouave	United Kingdom	4,256	Sunk
20 September 1943	HMCS St. Croix	Royal Canadian Navy	1,190	Sunk
7 January 1944	HMS Tweed	Royal Navy	1,370	Sunk

== Bibliography ==
- Busch, Rainer; Röll, Hans-Joachim (1999). German U-boat commanders of World War II : a biographical dictionary. Translated by Brooks, Geoffrey. London, Annapolis, Md: Greenhill Books, Naval Institute Press. ISBN 1-55750-186-6.
- Busch, Rainer; Röll, Hans-Joachim (1999). Der U-Boot-Krieg, 1939-1945: Deutsche U-Boot-Verluste von September 1939 bis Mai 1945 [German U-boat losses from September 1939 to May 1945] (in German). Vol. IV. Hamburg, Berlin, Bonn: Mittler. ISBN 3-8132-0514-2.
- Gröner, Erich; Jung, Dieter; Maass, Martin (1991). U-boats and Mine Warfare Vessels. German Warships 1815–1945. Vol. 2. Translated by Thomas, Keith; Magowan, Rachel. London: Conway Maritime Press. ISBN 0-85177-593-4.
- Whinney, Bob (1998). The U-Boat Peril: a fight for survival. Cassell Military Classics, London, 1998. ISBN 0-304-35132-6. Originally published by Poole in 1986.
- Bercuson, David J. (with H. Holger) (1998). Deadly Seas: The Story of the St.Croix, the U305 and the Battle of the Atlantic. Random House of Canada, Toronto, 1997. ISBN 978-0679309277.
