= Wolfpack Borkum =

- Active: 18 December 1943 – 3 January 1944
- Country: Nazi Germany
- Branch: Kriegsmarine
- Size: 17 submarines

Commanders
- Notable commanders: Karl-Heinz Marbach; Heinrich Schroeteler

Borkum was a wolf pack of German U-boats that operated during the battle of the Atlantic in World War II.

== Service history ==
Borkum was formed in December 1943 off the coast of Portugal, to intercept convoys sailing to and from Gibraltar, Mediterranean and South Atlantic. It was composed of U-boats from the disbanded patrol group Weddigen, with reinforcements from bases in occupied France.

Borkum was first detailed to assist the passage of blockade runners Osorno and Alsterufer which were returning to base. A surface force was also involved in this operation, code-named Bernau. Allied intelligence was aware of this and deployed forces against them. In the ensuing actions Borkum boats U-305 and U-415 attacked escort carrier Card, without success, while two destroyers were sunk; Leary by U-275 and Hurricane by U-415. U-645 was destroyed by destroyer Schenck and the Bernau force lost a destroyer and two torpedo boats. The blockade runners were also lost. The Borkum boats assisted in picking up survivors.

In January 1944 Borkum was reinforced by new U-boats, while a number of the original group returned to base. These came under air attack crossing the Bay of Biscay, and three, U-107, U-275 and U-541 were damaged.

The renewed Borkum group, of eight U-boats, was re-organized into three patrol lines to intercept an expected north-bound convoy (MKS 35). However MKS 35 had joined with SL 144 and a US hunter-killer group, centred on the carrier Block Island, while in the same period a south-bound convoy OS 64/KMS 38 passed through the same area.

In a series of actions U-305 sank the frigate HMS Tweed, escorting the south-bound convoy, while U-270 shot down a patrol aircraft, but three U-boats, U-270, U-382 and U-758 were damaged and forced to return. U-953 was subjected to a 13-hour hunt, but eventually escaped.

On 11 January, the Befehlshaber der U-Boote, the supreme commander of the German Navy's U-boat arm, disbanded Borkum; U-953 was sent on a solo patrol in the South Atlantic, which was successful, returning in February 1944. The remaining four boats were sent to reinforce group Rügen in the North Atlantic. None of these U-boats survived. U-377 was lost without a trace, while U-231 and U-305 were destroyed in transit. U-641 joined Rügen but was destroyed in an encounter with the corvette HMS Violet.

== U-boats involved ==
- U-107
- U-231
- U-270
- U-275
- U-305
- U-377
- U-382
- U-415
- U-541
- U-618
- U-641
- U-645
- U-667
- U-758
- U-801
- U-953
- U-962

== The name ==
Borkum was named after the island of Borkum off the German North Sea coast.
