= German submarine U-541 =

German World War II submarine

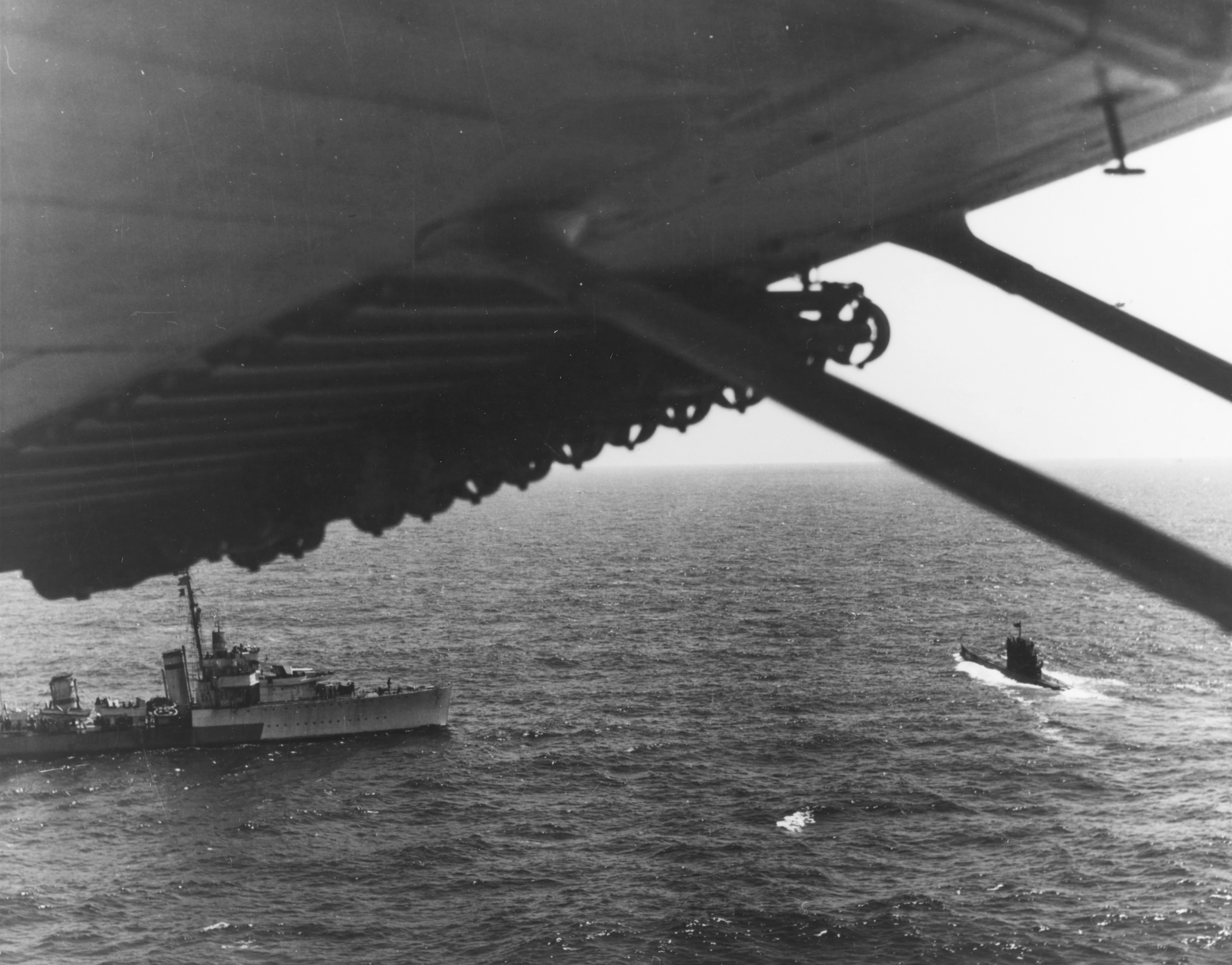
- U-541 surrendering on 11 May 1945

History

Nazi Germany
- Name: U-541
- Ordered: 5 June 1941
- Builder: Deutsche Werft, Hamburg
- Yard number: 362
- Laid down: 5 June 1942
- Launched: 5 January 1943
- Commissioned: 24 March 1943
- Fate: Surrendered on 12 May 1945 at Gibraltar; transferred to Lisahally in Northern Ireland. Sunk on 5 January 1946

General characteristics
- Class & type: Type IXC/40 submarine
- Displacement: 1,144 t (1,126 long tons) surfaced; 1,257 t (1,237 long tons) submerged
- Length: 76.76 m (251 ft 10 in) o/a; 58.75 m (192 ft 9 in) pressure hull
- Beam: 6.86 m (22 ft 6 in) o/a; 4.44 m (14 ft 7 in) pressure hull
- Height: 9.60 m (31 ft 6 in)
- Draught: 4.67 m (15 ft 4 in)
- Installed power: 4,400 PS (3,200 kW; 4,300 bhp) (diesels); 1,000 PS (740 kW; 990 shp) (electric)
- Propulsion: 2 shafts; 2 × diesel engines; 2 × electric motors
- Speed: 18.3 knots (33.9 km/h; 21.1 mph) surfaced; 7.3 knots (13.5 km/h; 8.4 mph) submerged
- Range: 13,850 nmi (25,650 km; 15,940 mi) at 10 knots (19 km/h; 12 mph) surfaced; 63 nmi (117 km; 72 mi) at 4 knots (7.4 km/h; 4.6 mph) submerged
- Test depth: 230 m (750 ft)
- Complement: 4 officers, 44 enlisted
- Armament: 6 × torpedo tubes (4 bow, 2 stern); 22 × 53.3 cm (21 in) torpedoes; 1 × 10.5 cm (4.1 in) SK C/32 deck gun (180 rounds); 1 × 3.7 cm (1.5 in) SK C/30 AA gun; 1 × twin 2 cm FlaK 30 AA guns

Service record
- Part of: 4th U-boat Flotilla 24 March – 31 October 1943; 10th U-boat Flotilla 1 November 1943 – 31 October 1944; 33rd U-boat Flotilla 1 November 1944 – 8 May 1945
- Identification codes: M 51 083
- Commanders: Kptlt. Kurt Petersen; 24 March 1943 – 12 May 1945
- Operations: 4 patrols: 1st patrol: 4 November 1943 – 9 January 1944; 2nd patrol: 29 February – 22 June 1944; 3rd patrol: a. 6 August – 11 November 1944 b. 1 – 3 April 1945; 4th patrol: 7 April – 12 May 1945
- Victories: 1 merchant ship sunk (2,140 GRT)

German submarine U-541 was a Type IXC U-boat of Nazi Germany's Kriegsmarine during World War II.

She was laid down at the Deutsche Werft (yard) in Hamburg as yard number 362 on 5 June 1942, launched on 5 January 1943 and commissioned on 24 March with Kapitänleutnant Kurt Petersen (Crew 36) in command.

U-541 began her service career with training as part of the 4th U-boat Flotilla from 24 March 1943. She was reassigned to the 10th flotilla for operations on 1 November, then the 33rd flotilla on 1 November 1944.

She carried out four patrols and sank one ship. She was a member of four wolfpacks.

She surrendered on 12 May 1945 at Gibraltar and was transferred to Lisahally in Northern Ireland for Operation Deadlight. She was sunk on 5 January 1946.

== Design ==
German Type IXC/40 submarines were slightly larger than the original Type IXCs. U-541 had a displacement of 1,144 tonnes (1,126 long tons) when at the surface and 1,257 tonnes (1,237 long tons) while submerged. The U-boat had a total length of 76.76 m (251 ft 10 in), a pressure hull length of 58.75 m (192 ft 9 in), a beam of 6.86 m (22 ft 6 in), a height of 9.60 m (31 ft 6 in), and a draught of 4.67 m (15 ft 4 in). The submarine was powered by two MAN M 9 V 40/46 supercharged four-stroke, nine-cylinder diesel engines producing a total of 4,400 metric horsepower (3,240 kW; 4,340 shp) for use while surfaced, two Siemens-Schuckert 2 GU 345/34 double-acting electric motors producing a total of 1,000 shaft horsepower (1,010 PS; 750 kW) for use while submerged. She had two shafts and two 1.92 m (6 ft) propellers. The boat was capable of operating at depths of up to 230 metres (750 ft).

The submarine had a maximum surface speed of 18.3 knots (33.9 km/h; 21.1 mph) and a maximum submerged speed of 7.3 knots (13.5 km/h; 8.4 mph). When submerged, the boat could operate for 63 nautical miles (117 km; 72 mi) at 4 knots (7.4 km/h; 4.6 mph); when surfaced, she could travel 13,850 nautical miles (25,650 km; 15,940 mi) at 10 knots (19 km/h; 12 mph). U-541 was fitted with six 53.3 cm (21 in) torpedo tubes (four fitted at the bow and two at the stern), 22 torpedoes, one 10.5 cm (4.13 in) SK C/32 naval gun, 180 rounds, and a 3.7 cm (1.5 in) SK C/30 as well as a 2 cm (0.79 in) C/30 anti-aircraft gun. The boat had a complement of forty-eight.

== Service history ==
=== First patrol ===
U-541's first patrol began with her departure from Kiel on 4 November 1943. She passed through the gap separating Iceland and the Faroe Islands before heading out into the Atlantic Ocean.

She entered Lorient, on the French Atlantic coast, on 9 January 1944.

=== Second and third patrols ===
For her second foray, U-541 headed toward the eastern seaboard of North America.

On her third sortie, she sank the Livingston northeast of Louisbourg, Nova Scotia.

The boat was preparing to attack a convoy while on the surface in the Gulf of St. Lawrence when HMCS Norsyd opened fire; U-541 was forced to dive. She was then hunted for two days by four frigates, a minesweeper and aircraft of the Royal Canadian Air Force (RCAF), but escaped.

==== Serpa Pinto ====
On 26 May 1944, on its way from Lisbon (departure 16 May 1944) to Port Richmond, Philadelphia, USA (arrival 30 May 1944), the Serpa Pinto was stopped in the mid-Atlantic by the U-541. The U-boat's captain ordered the Serpa Pinto's crew and passengers to abandon the ship in the lifeboats, and requested permission from Kriegsmarine headquarters to torpedo the ship. The passengers and crew, with the exception of the captain who decided to remain on board whatever the German decision, duly left the ship in the lifeboats. There they were forced to wait all night while the German U-boat awaited a reply to its request. By dawn an answer had arrived from Admiral Karl Dönitz, who refused permission to sink the ship. The U-boat then departed the area and the lifeboats returned to the ship. The ship's doctor, a cooker and a 15 months child drowned during this incident. Two military-aged Americans were taken in the submarine.

=== Fourth patrol ===
Her last patrol began in Horten Naval Base in Norway on 7 April 1945. It ended with her surrender in Gibraltar on 12 May 1945.

=== Fate ===
U-541 was transferred to Lisahally in Northern Ireland for Operation Deadlight. She was sunk on 5 January 1946 at 55°38′N 07°35′W.

=== Wolfpacks ===
U-541 took part in four wolfpacks, namely:

- Coronel (4 – 8 December 1943)
- Coronel 2 (8 – 14 December 1943)
- Coronel 3 (14 – 17 December 1943)
- Borkum (18 – 26 December 1943)

== Summary of raiding history ==
Date	Ship Name	Nationality	Tonnage (GRT)	Fate
3 September 1944	Livingston	United Kingdom	2,140	Sunk

== Bibliography ==
- Busch, Rainer; Röll, Hans-Joachim (1999). German U-boat commanders of World War II: a biographical dictionary. Translated by Brooks, Geoffrey. London, Annapolis, Md: Greenhill Books, Naval Institute Press. ISBN 1-55750-186-6.
- Busch, Rainer; Röll, Hans-Joachim (1999). Deutsche U-Boot-Verluste von September 1939 bis Mai 1945 [German U-boat losses from September 1939 to May 1945]. Der U-Boot-Krieg (in German). Vol. IV. Hamburg, Berlin, Bonn: Mittler. ISBN 3-8132-0514-2.
- Gröner, Erich; Jung, Dieter; Maass, Martin (1991). U-boats and Mine Warfare Vessels. German Warships 1815–1945. Vol. 2. Translated by Thomas, Keith; Magowan, Rachel. London: Conway Maritime Press. ISBN 0-85177-593-4.
