= Convoys HX 229/SC 122 =

Convoy during naval battles of the Second World War

Coordinates: 50.6333°N 34.7667°W

Convoy HX 229 (plus delayed 229A) /SC 122
- Part of World War II
- Relief map of the North Atlantic Ocean
Date	16–19 March 1943
Location	North Atlantic
Result	German victory

Belligerents
Germany	United Kingdom; United States; Canada; Belgium

Commanders and leaders
Admiral Karl Dönitz	B4 Group: G. J. Luther; later E. C. Day; B5 Group: R. C. Boyle

Strength
Raubgraf 10 U-boats; Stürmer 18 U-boats; Dränger 11 U-boats Total: 39	HX229: 50 ships, 5 escorts SC122: 60 ships, 8 escorts plus reinforcements

Casualties and losses
1 U-boat destroyed 7 damaged 49 killed	HX229: 13 ships (93,502 GRT); 249 killed SC122: 9 ships (53,694 GRT); 112 killed

During the Battle of the Atlantic, British merchant shipping was formed into convoys for protection against German submarine attack. In March 1943 convoys HX 229 and SC 122 were the focus of the largest convoy battle of the Second World War. Kriegsmarine tactics against convoys employed wolfpack tactics in nearly simultaneous surface attacks at night. Patrolling aircraft restricted the ability of submarines to converge on convoys during daylight. The North Atlantic winters offered the longest periods of darkness to conceal surfaced submarine operations. The winter of 1942–43 saw the largest number of submarines deployed to the mid-Atlantic before comprehensive anti-submarine aircraft patrols could be extended into that area.

During March, there was a series of fierce convoy battles which became, for the Allies, the crisis point of the whole campaign. One hundred merchant ships in trade convoys HX 229 and SC 122 encountered three wolfpacks of 38 submarines in a single sprawling action, which German radio reported as "the greatest convoy battle of all time" (Die grösste Geleitzugschlacht aller Zeiten). A Royal Navy report later concluded "The Germans never came so near to disrupting communications between the New World and the Old as in the first 20 days of March 1943".

== Convoy SC 122 ==
SC 122 was a slow eastbound convoy of 60 ships, routed from New York to Liverpool. (This was during the period when SC convoys were switched from Sydney, Cape Breton, to New York; this was reversed later due to congestion problems there.) It sailed on 5 March 1943, protected at first by one destroyer and five corvettes of the Western Local Escort Force. On 6 March, off Cape Cod, two ships put back to New York due to heavy weather, and on 8 March, another six abandoned the crossing, and put into Halifax.

The convoy pressed on, changing escorts on 13 March off Cape Race. The western local group left, after the Mid-Ocean Escort Force B5 Escort Group joined from St John's. B5 Escort Group consisted of eight warships, led by Commander RC Boyle in the destroyer HMS Havelock, the destroyer USS Upshur, the River-class frigate HMS Swale, the Flower-class corvettes Buttercup, Godetia, Lavender, Pimpernel and Saxifrage, and a trawler as rescue vessel.

== Convoy HX 229 ==
HX 229 was also eastbound and sailed from New York on 8 March, with 40 ships and the local escort. A further 34 ships which should have been included were delayed due to congestion at New York; they sailed the following day as HX 229A. The first few days of the convoy were uneventful; HX 229 met its Mid-Ocean Escort Force on 14 March and the local escort departed. The ocean escort was B4 Escort Group from St John's, of four destroyers and a corvette. It was led on this occasion by Lieutenant Commander Gordon John Luther of HMS Volunteer, as its regular leader was in dock for repairs. Luther, although an ASW specialist, had recently joined the group and this was only his second crossing. The other ships of B4 were the destroyers HMS Beverley, Mansfield and Witherington and the corvette Anemone, although Witherington had to detach on 15 March, to be replaced by the corvette Pennywort for the crossing.

HX 229A sailed on 9 March, meeting its ocean escort, 40 Escort Group, on 15 March. This comprised six sloop-type warships under Cdr. J Dalison in HMS Aberdeen. Taking a more northerly route than HX 229, the convoy remained undetected by German patrol lines and made a safe and timely landfall on 26 March. The voyage was not without its perils though. The more northerly route took it into an icefield and two ships were damaged by icebergs, rerouting to Iceland. The convoy vice-commodore's vessel the Svend Foyn was also damaged and ultimately sank on March 19, 1943.

== Wolfpacks ==
Arrayed against them were three patrol lines (rakes) of U-boats:

- Raubgraf, ("Robber Baron"), of eight boats was already formed, having just been involved in a battle with HX 228; it was sent to patrol off east of Newfoundland, at the western edge of the Air Gap.
- Stürmer ("Daredevil"), a new group of 18 boats, was to form up in the middle of the Air Gap. It was formed from boats from patrol group Westmark, which had previously engaged SC 121.
- A further group, Dränger ("Harrier"), of eleven boats formed to the east of Stürmer. Some of these boats were from Neuland, which had also been in the battle with HX 228; the rest were newcomers.

== The battle ==
The German B-Dienst signals intelligence group had given notice of an east-bound convoy and by 8pm on 13 March had a location for SC 122. Admiral Karl Dönitz, commanding the U-boat fleet, directed Raubgraf to intercept, forming a new rake to the west. A westerly gale gave speed to SC 122, which passed through Raubgrafs patrol area on the morning of 15 March just 24 hours before the patrol line was formed.

The Allied Ultra intelligence, which decrypted German messages enciphered using the Enigma machine and which had helped the Admiralty to divert convoys away from wolf packs, had been "blinded" on 10 March 1943 as the result of the Germans bringing in a new short weather report. This resulted in the British code breakers being starved of the cribs necessary to break "Shark", the cipher used by the German U-boats. The U-boat tracking room at the Admiralty Operational Intelligence Centre was therefore unable to divert convoys around the U-boat packs. A message from a U-boat gave away its position once that position had been fixed by DF and the convoy SC 122 was diverted around the estimated danger area.

The Allied Cipher Number 3 used by the convoy escorts had been broken by the Germans. This allowed them to position wolf packs in the way of HX 229, which was following a similar course. It passed through Raubgraf's rake in the night of 15/16 March without being sighted because of bad weather. On the morning of 16 March U-653, which had detached from Raubgraf to return to base with mechanical problems, sighted HX 229 heading east and sent a sighting report. Dönitz immediately ordered Raubgraf to pursue and intercept, while Stürmer and Dränger were ordered west to form a line ahead of the convoy. He saw in this an opportunity to attack an east-bound convoy, full of war materials bound for Europe, with the full width of the Air Gap to cross.

Raubgraf caught up with HX 229 on the evening of 16 March and mounted an attack that night. Three ships were sunk and another five on the morning of 17 March, a total of eight in just 8 hours. The escort was reported to be weak, as 2 ships had dropped out to pick up survivors. The escorts chased 3 contacts during the night but with no result. During the rest of the day, boats from Stürmer began to arrive. One of these was attacked by a destroyer but again without success.

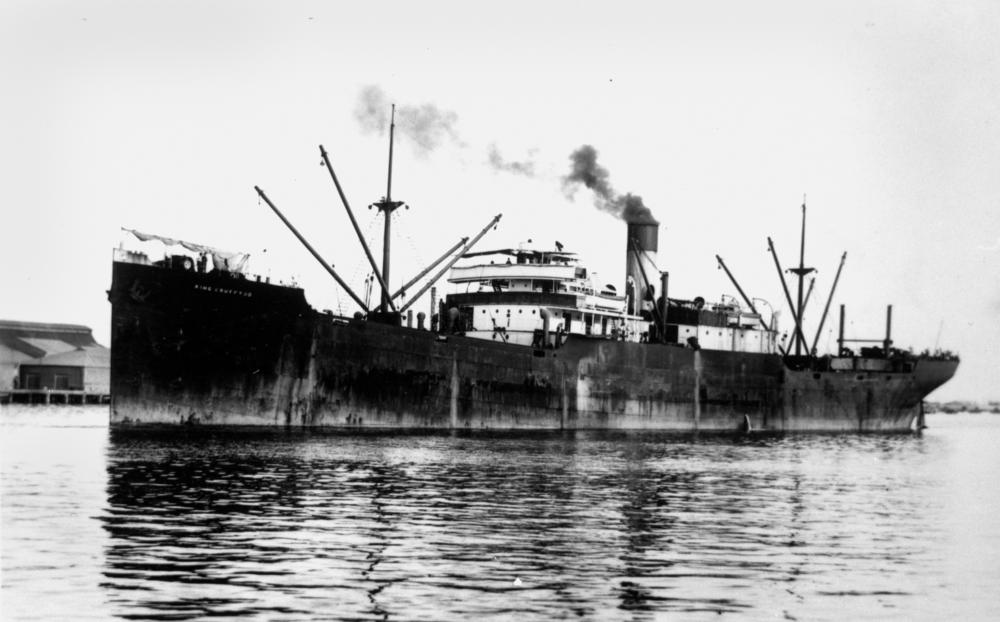
5,072 GRT cargo steamship King Gruffyd, a member of SC 122 that U-338 sank on 17 March

At the north-eastern end of Stürmer's rake, German submarine U-338 had sighted SC 122 heading east, about 120 miles from HX 229's position. After sending a sighting report she attacked, sinking four ships in quick succession. A fifth, Fort Cedar Lake, was damaged, to be sunk later in the day. Two more ships from HX 229 were lost during the day. Two boats from Stürmer were able to penetrate the defences about midday on 17 March but the escorts were able to fend off any further attacks, assisted by brief visits from Very Long Range (VLR) aircraft flying at extreme range. SC 122 was also able to resist further attacks until evening.

During the night of 17/18 March the attack on both convoys, now just 70 miles apart, continued. U-338 sank the freighter Granville, of SC 122 in the evening, surviving a fierce counter-attack by escorts, and after midnight U-305 sank two more ships (Port Auckland and Zouave).

HX 229's escort suffered a blow as HMS Mansfield was forced to detach during the night of 17/18 March. Help was on its way in the form of the destroyer HMS Highlander, under Commander ECL Day. Arriving on 18 March, Day, as a senior and more experienced officer, took command of B4 Group for the rest of the engagement. Also en route from Hvalfjord, in Iceland, were the destroyers HMS Vimy and USS Babbitt, for HX 229, and the US Coast Guard cutter USCGC Ingham for SC 122. These were dispatched on the morning of 18 March, and arrived the following day.

On the afternoon of 18 March, U-221 succeeded in sinking two ships of HX 229 but further losses were avoided. HMS Highlander joined that afternoon, a welcome addition as B4 was by this time reduced to five ships.

During the night of 18/19 March the two convoys were running in tandem, though sailing independently. All attacks on both convoys were repelled this night, and six firm contacts were attacked but little damage was inflicted. One ship from HX 229 was lost, a romper which broke away to proceed independently; this ship, Matthew Luckenbach, ran into the melée around SC 122 and was torpedoed, to be sunk later on 19 March. A straggler from SC 122, Clarissa Radcliffe, was also sunk with all hands by U-663.

On 19 March the escorts were reinforced by the arrival of Vimy and Babitt, for HX 229, and Ingham for SC 122. HX 229 was also joined by the corvette HMS Abelia, detached from another convoy. Also on 19 March U-384 was attacked by air patrol to the north of SC 122 and sunk. There were no further losses to the convoys that day; faced with stiffening resistance and sensing nothing further would be achieved without disproportionate losses, Dönitz called off the assault.

The convoys continued east. Further changes to the escort occurred on 20 March as reinforcement arrived in the form of the corvette HMCS Sherbrooke, while Upshur and Ingham were detached. The local escort groups met on 23 March, and HX 229, with 27 ships surviving, arrived at Liverpool on 23 March. SC 122, with 42 remaining ships, arrived later the same day.

== Outcome ==
The double battle had involved 90 merchant ships and 16 escort ships (though not all were present at the same time). In all, 22 merchant ships were sunk (13 from HX 229 and 9 from SC 122), a loss of 146,000 tons. An estimated 361 merchant seamen died, with 249 from HX 229 and 112 from SC 122. In total, 38 U-boats had taken part (though throughout the battle not all had been in contact). One U-boat, U-384, had been lost with all hands, though a number had been damaged. The battle was undoubtedly a success for the Germans. However, they had failed to interrupt the North Atlantic convoy route to any extent; 68 ships (two-thirds of those involved) made a safe and timely arrival, and the 38 ships of HX 229A, which had been detached at New York to cross separately, arrived unscathed.

This was the largest convoy battle of the Atlantic campaign. A Royal Navy report later concluded "It appeared possible that we should not be able to regard convoy as an effective system of defence".

March 1943 marked the low point of Allied fortunes in the Atlantic campaign. The month saw four home-bound convoys attacked, and a total of 39 ships sunk; yet of those four convoys over 200 arrived safely, while four other eastbound convoys were unharmed. None of the eight westbound convoys in March were attacked. Also during March nine U-boats were destroyed in the Atlantic, and more were damaged, leading to a hiatus in U-boat operations during April. When the offensive renewed in May, it saw a major defeat for the U-boat Arm, and the turning point of the campaign.

== Losses ==
=== Allied ships ===
HX 229

Date	Name	Flag	Casualties	Tonnage (GRT)	Sunk by
16 March 1943	Elin K	Norway	0	5,214	U-603
16/17 March 1943	Zaanland	Netherlands	0	6,513	U-758
16/17 March 1943	Southern Princess	United Kingdom	4	12,156	U-600
16/17 March 1943	Harry Luckenbach	United States	80	6,366	U-91
16/17 March 1943	Coracero	United Kingdom	5	7,252	U-384
16/17 March 1943	Terkoeli	Netherlands	36	5,158	U-631, U-384?
17 March 1943	James Oglethorpe	United States	44	7,176	U-758, U-91
17 March 1943	William Eustis	United States	0	7,196	U-435, U-91
17 March 1943	Nariva	United Kingdom	0	8,714	U-600, U-91
17 March 1943	Irenee du Pont	United States	24	6,125	U-600, U-91
18 March 1943	William Q Gresham	United States	27	7,191	U-221
18 March 1943	Canadian Star	United Kingdom	29	8,293	U-221
19 March 1943	Matthew Luckenbach	United States	?	5,848	U-523, U-527

SC 122

Date	Name	Flag	Casualties	Tonnage (GRT)	Sunk by
16/17 March 1943	Kingsbury	United Kingdom	4	4,898	U-338
16/17 March 1943	King Gruffydd	United Kingdom	22	5,072	U-338
16/17 March 1943	Alderamin	Netherlands	0	7,886	U-338
17 March 1943	Fort Cedar Lake	United Kingdom	0	7,134	U-338, U-665
17 March 1943	Port Auckland	United Kingdom	8	8,789	U-305
18 March 1943	Zouave	United Kingdom	13	4,256	U-305
18 March 1943	Granville	Panama	12	4,071	U-338
18/19 March 1943	Carras	Greece	0	5,234	U-333, U-666
19 March 1943	Clarissa Radcliffe	United Kingdom	53	5,754	U-663

=== U-boats ===
U-boats destroyed
Date	Number	Type	gruppe	Notes
19 March 1943	U-384	VIIC	Sturmer	B-17 of 206 Squadron RAF, 49 casualties

U-boats damaged
Date	Number	Type	gruppe	Convoy	Notes
19 Mar 1943	U-134	VIIC	Sturmer	HX 229	d/c, damaged by Anemone, Volunteer
18 Mar 1943	U-305	VIIC	Sturmer	SC 122	d/c by aircraft × 4; forced to break off and return to base
19 Mar 1943	U-338	VIIC	Sturmer	SC 122	d/c by Lavender, Upshur (17th): d/c, s damaged by Sunderland /423 Sqn
19 Mar 1943	U-439	VIIC	Sturmer	HX 229	d/c Liberator /86 Sqdn (17th); dc, damage by Highlander
17 Mar 1943	U-530	VIIC	Sturmer	HX 229	dc, damage by Beverley
20 Mar 1943	U-598	VIIC	Sturmer	SC 122, HX 229	d/c, damage by Sund. /201 Sqn
20 Mar 1943	U-631	VIIC	Sturmer	HX 229	d/c, damage by Sund. /201 Sqn
19 Mar 1943	U-666	VIIC	Sturmer	SC 122	d/c by Lib /86 Sqn, Godetia, Upshur (17th); dc, damage by Fortress /220 Sqn

== See also ==
- Convoy Battles of World War II

== Bibliography ==
- Hague, Arnold (2000). The Allied Convoy System 1939–1945: Its Organization, Defence, and Operation. Annapolis, MD: Naval Institute Press. ISBN 978-1-55-750019-9.
- Blair, Clay (1998). Hitler's U-Boat War: The Hunted 1942–1945. ISBN 0-304-35261-6.
- Alan Burn (1999). The Fighting Commodores: The Convoy Commanders in the Second World War. Annapolis, MD: Naval Institute Press. ISBN 978-1-55-750283-4.
- Kemp, Paul (1997). U-Boats Destroyed: German Submarine Losses in World Wars. Annapolis, MD: Naval Institute Press. ISBN 1-55750-8593.
- Middlebrook, Martin (1976). Convoy. New York: Viking Press. OCLC 641970843.
- Niestle, Axel (1998). German U-Boat Losses during World War II: Details of Destruction. Barnsley: Greenhill Books. ISBN 1-85367-352-8.
- Roskill, Stephen (1956). The Period of Balance. The War at Sea 1939–1945. Vol. II. London: HMSO. OCLC 59620954.
- Rohwer, Jürgen (1977). The Critical Convoy Battles of March 1943: The Battle for HX 229/SC 122. Annapolis, MD: Naval Institute Press. ISBN 0-87021-818-2 – via Archive Foundation.
- van der Vat, Dan (1987). The Atlantic Campaign: World War II's Great Struggle at Sea. New York: Harper & Row. ISBN 0-340-37751-8 – via Archive Foundation.
