= Garbe, Lahmeyer & Co. =

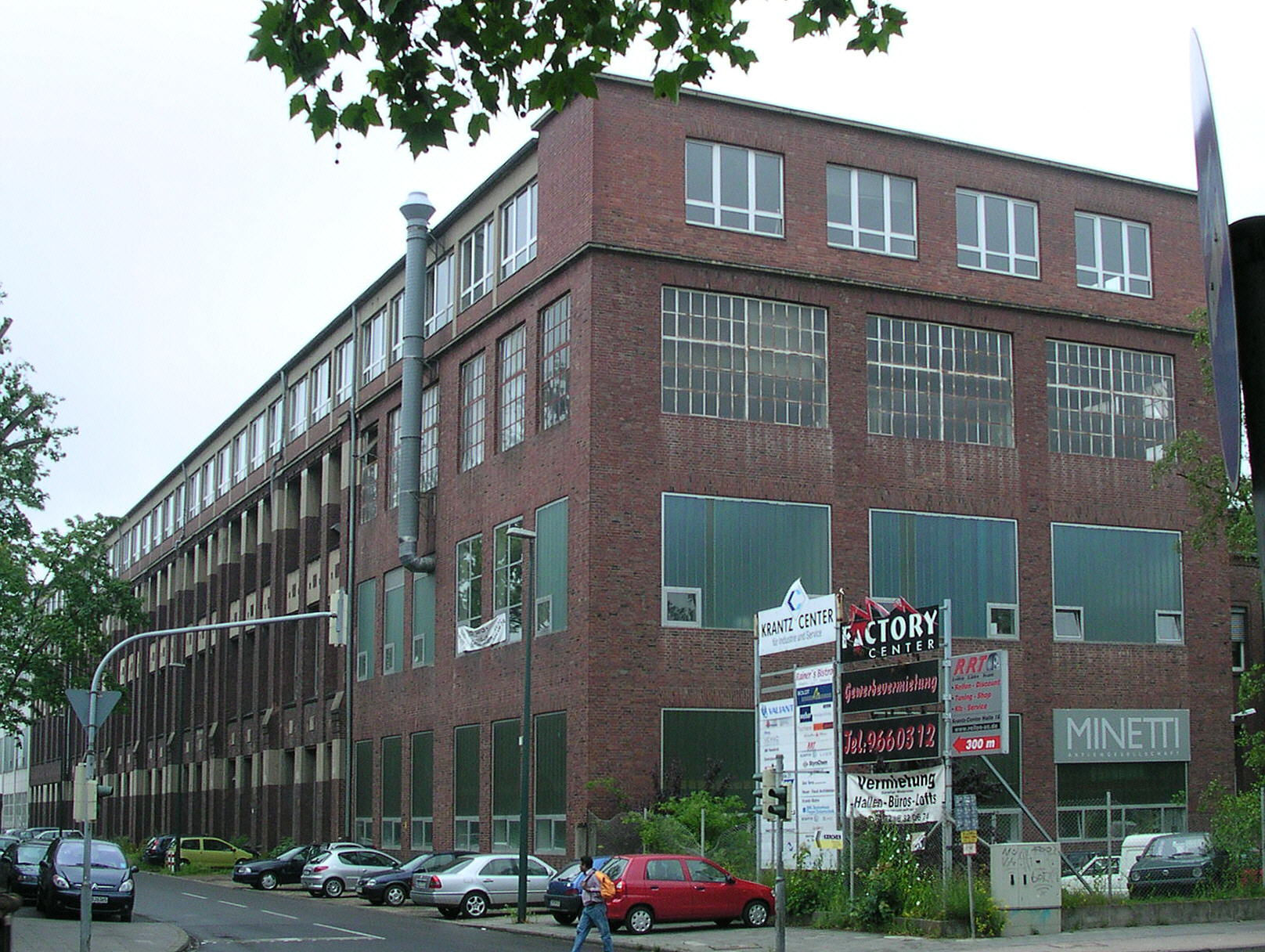
- Industry: Electrical engineering
- Predecessor: DEW - Deutsche Elektrizitäts-Werke zu Aachen
- Founded: 1886
- Founder: Wilhelm Lahmeyer
- Defunct: 1994
- Headquarters: Aachen, Germany
- Owner: CGEE Alsthom

Garbe, Lahmeyer & Co. (until 1938 also known as: DEW - Deutsche Elektrizitäts-Werke zu Aachen) is a former electrical engineering company in Aachen.

The company was founded in 1886 by Wilhelm Lahmeyer in Aachen as Deutsche Elektrizitäts-Werke zu Aachen, Garbe, Lahmeyer & Co.. Lahmeyer left the company only a few years later, but the company still used his name. From 1938 the company was known as Garbe, Lahmeyer & Co. (GL).

GL produced all sorts of electric motors, electric generators, alternators, starters, motor–generator, and other electrical equipment. During World War II, GL supplied the generators for the battleships Bismarck and Tirpitz. They were also one of the suppliers of electric motors for Type VIIC U-boats.

In 1973 GL was taken over by CGEE Alsthom.
