= List of shipwrecks in March 1943 =

The list of shipwrecks in March 1943 includes ships sunk, foundered, grounded, or otherwise lost during March 1943.

== 1 March ==
List of shipwrecks: 1 March 1943
Ship	State	Description
B 192 San Carlo	Regia Marina	World War II: The auxiliary minesweeper, a requisitioned fishing schooner, was bombed and sunk at Palermo in an Allied air raid.
Fitz-John Porter	United States	World War II: Convoy BT 6: The Liberty ship was torpedoed and sunk in the Atlantic Ocean (12°20′S 37°01′W) by U-518 (Kriegsmarine) with the loss of one of her 55 crew. Survivors were rescued by Carioca (Brazilian Navy).
Geniere	Regia Marina	World War II: The Soldati-class destroyer was bombed and sunk in drydock at Palermo, Sicily in an Allied air raid. Three of her crew were killed. The wreck was raised in 1944 for scrapping but sank whilst being towed to Taranto, Italy.
Lampedusa	Italy	World War II: The coaster was bombed and sunk at Palermo in an Allied air raid.
Monsone	Regia Marina	World War II: The Ciclone-class torpedo boat was bombed and sunk at Naples in an Allied air raid. There were eight killed and eighteen wounded.
MZ 741	Regia Marina	World War II: The landing craft was bombed and sunk in drydock at Palermo in an Allied air raid.
Ocean Courage	United Kingdom	The Ocean ship was torpedoed and sunk in the Atlantic Ocean (10°52′N 23°28′W) by U-182 (Kriegsmarine).
Porto Adriano	Regia Marina	World War II: The tug was bombed and sunk at Palermo in an Allied air raid.
Rhea	Vichy France	The cargo ship was wrecked near Naples.
S 56	Kriegsmarine	World War II: The E-boat was bombed and sunk at Palermo in an Allied air raid. She was raised on 18 March and repaired.
San Vincenzo	Italy	World War II: The coaster was torpedoed and sunk in the Mediterranean Sea by HMS Turbulent (Royal Navy).
SF 54	Luftwaffe	World War II: The Siebel ferry was bombed and sunk at Palermo in an Allied air raid.
Tromøsund	Norway	World War II: The cargo ship was bombed and sunk in the North Sea by Luftwaffe aircraft with the loss of all 44 people aboard.

== 2 March ==
List of shipwrecks: 2 March 1943
Ship	State	Description
Affonso Penna	Brazil	World War II: The passenger ship was torpedoed and sunk in the Atlantic Ocean off the coast of Brazil by Barbarigo (Regia Marina) with the loss of 125 of her 242 passengers and crew.
Kyokusei Maru	Imperial Japanese Army	World War II: Battle of the Bismarck Sea: Operation 81-transport convoy, No. 2 Division (portside column): The Kyokusei Maru-class auxiliary transport ship was bombed and sunk off Lae, New Guinea (05°02′S 148°14′E) by Boeing B-17 Flying Fortress aircraft of the United States Army Air Forces. A crewman and 485 troops were killed. Eight hundred surviving troops were rescued by Yukikaze and Asagumo (both Imperial Japanese Navy), with the troops taken to Lae.
Meriwether Lewis	United States	World War II: Convoy HX 227: The Liberty ship straggled behind the convoy. She was torpedoed and sunk in the Atlantic Ocean (62°10′N 28°25′W) by U-634 (Kriegsmarine) with the loss of all 75 people aboard (44 crew and 31 armed guards).
Penthièvre	Kriegsmarine	World War II: The cargo ship was shelled and sunk in the English Channel by shore-based artillery stationed at Dover, Kent, United Kingdom with the loss of 22 of her crew.
USS SC-1024	United States Navy	World War II: The submarine chaser was sunk in a collision off North Carolina when two convoys respectively northbound and southbound met in bad visibility. She was rammed by USS Plymouth (United States Navy) and then by Cities Service Fuel (United States). SC-1024 capsized and sank with the loss of all hands.
Toen Maru	Imperial Japanese Navy	World War II: The fleet oiler was torpedoed and sunk in the Makassar Strait (03°29′S 117°17′E) by USS Thresher (United States Navy).
HMT Ut Prosim	Royal Navy	World War II: The naval drifter was sunk in Dover Harbour by a near miss from a German long-range shell. A crew member was killed.
Wellfleet	United States	World War II: The tug was sunk in a collision off North Carolina when two convoys respectively northbound and southbound met in bad visibility. She was rammed by Edward L Doheny (United States) and sank, but all hands were rescued.

== 3 March ==
List of shipwrecks: 3 March 1943
Ship	State	Description
Aiyo Maru	Imperial Japanese Army	World War II: Battle of the Bismarck Sea: Operation 81-transport convoy, No. 1 Division (starboard column): The Type 1C Standard cargo ship/transport was bombed and sunk southeast of Finschhafen, New Guinea (06°56′S 148°16′E) by American and Australian aircraft. Forty-five crewmen and 278 troops were killed. Five Daihatsu landing craft went down with the ship.
Arashio	Imperial Japanese Navy	World War II: Battle of the Bismarck Sea: Operation 81-transport convoy: The Asashio-class destroyer was bombed and sunk in the Bismarck Sea near Finschhafen (07°15′S 148°30′E) by Allied aircraft. Seventy-two of her crew were killed. One hundred and seventy-six survivors were rescued by Yukikaze (Imperial Japanese Navy).
Asashio	Imperial Japanese Navy	World War II: Battle of the Bismarck Sea: Operation 81-transport convoy: The Asashio-class destroyer was bombed and sunk in the Bismarck Sea near Finschhafen (07°15′S 148°15′E) by Royal Australian Air Force and United States Army Air Forces aircraft. She was lost with some 200 men with some survivors, or was lost with all crew.
Clairette	France	World War II: The fishing vessel was sunk with gunfire off Cap Ferrat, Alpes-Maritimes by HMS Taurus (Royal Navy). Her three crew were rescued by an Italian boat.
Doggerbank	Kriegsmarine	World War II: The blockade runner was torpedoed and sunk in the Atlantic Ocean (29°10′N 34°10′W) by U-43 (Kriegsmarine) with the loss of 364 of 365 people on board, 108 crewmen and 257 survivors of Thor and Uckermack (both destroyed by an accidental explosion in Japan on 30 November 1942). The survivor was rescued by Campoamor (Spain).
Harvey W. Scott	United States	World War II: Convoy DN 21: The Liberty ship was torpedoed and sunk in the Indian Ocean (31°54′S 30°37′E) by U-160 (Kriegsmarine). There were no casualties. All 42 crewmen and nineteen armed guards were rescued by Ombu (Argentina) or reached land in their lifeboats.
Kenbu Maru	Imperial Japanese Army	Kembu Maru World War II: Battle of the Bismarck Sea: Operation 81-transport convoy, No. 1 Division (starboard column): The Kenbu Maru-class auxiliary transport was bombed by American and Australian aircraft south-east of Finschhafen (06°56′S 148°16′E). She exploded and sank. Twenty troops were killed.
Nirpura	United Kingdom	World War II: Convoy DN 21: The cargo ship was torpedoed and sunk in the Indian Ocean 40 nautical miles (74 km; 46 mi) south of Port St. Johns, Union of South Africa (32°47′S 30°48′E) by U-160 (Kriegsmarine) with the loss of 38 of the 126 people aboard. Survivors were rescued by R-8 ( South African Air Force).
Nojima	Imperial Japanese Navy	World War II: Battle of the Bismarck Sea: Operation 81-transport convoy, No. 2 Division (portside column): The Muroto-class supply ship was bombed and damaged 31 nautical miles (57 km; 36 mi) east south east of Finschhafen (07°15′S 148°30′E) by American and Australian aircraft. Following a collision with Arashio (Imperial Japanese Navy), she sank 50 nautical miles (93 km; 58 mi) off Finschhafen. Four hundred men were killed. Ro-101 (Imperial Japanese Navy) rescued her captain and 44 infantrymen from lifeboats on 7 March, south of the Dampier Strait.
Oigawa Maru	Imperial Japanese Army	World War II: Battle of the Bismarck Sea: Operation 81-transport convoy, No. 2 Division (portside column): The Type 1A Standard transport was bombed and damaged southeast of Finschhafen (06°56′S 148°16′E) by American and Australian aircraft. She was finished off that night by USS PT-143 and USS PT-150 (both United States Navy). Seventy-eight crewmen and 1,151 troops were killed.
Shinai Maru	Imperial Japanese Army	World War II: Battle of the Bismarck Sea: Operation 81-transport convoy No. 1 Division (starboard column): The Shinia Maru-class auxiliary transport was bombed and sunk south east of Finschhafen (06°56′S 148°16′E) by American and Australian aircraft. Eighteen crewmen, 45 gunners and an unknown number of troops were killed.
Shirayuki	Imperial Japanese Navy	World War II: Battle of the Bismarck Sea: Operation 81-transport convoy: The Fubuki-class destroyer was bombed and sunk in the Bismarck Sea near Finschhafen (07°15′S 148°30′E) by Royal Australian Air Force and United States Army Air Forces aircraft. Thirty-two of her crew were killed.
Stag Hound	United States	World War II: The Type C2-SU-R ship was torpedoed and sunk in the Atlantic Ocean off the coast of Brazil by Barbarigo (Regia Marina). All aboard, 59 crew and 25 gunners, survived and were rescued the next day by Rio Colorado (Argentina.
Taimei Maru	Imperial Japanese Army	Taimei Maru under attack on 3 March 1943 World War II: Battle of the Bismarck Sea: Operation 81-transport convoy, No. 2 Division (portside column): The Taimei Maru-class auxiliary transport was bombed and sunk 31 nautical miles (57 km; 36 mi) east south east of Finschhafen (07°15′S 148°30′E) by American and Australian aircraft. Forty-four of her crew and 35 soldiers were killed.
Teiyo Maru	Imperial Japanese Army	World War II: Battle of the Bismarck Sea: Operation 81-transport convoy, No. 1 Division (starboard column): The transport ship was bombed and sunk south-east of Finschhafen, New Guinea (06°56′S 148°16′E) by American and Australian aircraft. Her commanding officer, seventeen of her crew, fifteen gunners and 1,882 troops were killed. Also lost were six Daihatsu landing craft, fifteen collapsible boats, and six row boats.

== 4 March ==
List of shipwrecks: 4 March 1943
Ship	State	Description
California Star	United Kingdom	World War II: The cargo ship was torpedoed and sunk in the Atlantic Ocean 380 nautical miles (700 km; 440 mi) north west of the Azores, Portugal (42°32′N 37°20′W) by U-515 (Kriegsmarine) with the loss of 50 of her 74 crew. One survivor was taken aboard U-515 as a prisoner of war.
City of Pretoria	United Kingdom	World War II: The cargo ship was torpedoed and sunk in the Atlantic Ocean north west of the Azores (41°45′N 42°30′W) by U-172 (Kriegsmarine) with the loss of all 145 crew.
Empire Mahseer	United Kingdom	World War II: Convoy DN 21: The Design 1022 ship was torpedoed and sunk in the Indian Ocean (32°01′S 30°48′E) by U-160 (Kriegsmarine) with the loss of eighteen of her 54 crew. Survivors were rescued by HMT Norwich City (Royal Navy).
Hokuto Maru	Japan	World War II: Convoy No. 2303B: The cargo ship was torpedoed in the Pacific Ocean southwest of "Miyako" (39°33′N 142°07′E) by USS Permit (United States Navy). Although the torpedo did not explode, it holed her hull and she consequently sank. Her passengers and crew were rescued by Hiyoshi Maru No. 2 Go (Imperial Japanese Navy).
USS LCP(R) 673, USS LCP(R) 680, USS LCP(R) 684, USS LCP(R) 685, USS LCP(R) 689, USS LCP(R) 692, USS LCP(R) 693, and USS LCP(R) 727	United States Navy	The landing craft personnel (ramped) were deck cargo aboard Marietta E. (United Kingdom) and were lost when that ship was torpedoed and sunk in the Indian Ocean (31°49′S 31°11′E) by U-160 (Kriegsmarine).
Marietta E.	United Kingdom	World War II: Convoy DN 21: The cargo ship was torpedoed and sunk in the Indian Ocean (31°49′S 31°11′E) by U-160 (Kriegsmarine) with the loss of five of her 45 crew. Survivors were rescued by R-8 ( South African Air Force). Marietta E. was on a voyage from Durban, Union of South Africa to Aden, Aden Protectorate.
SF 219	Luftwaffe	World War II: The Siebel ferry was mined and sunk in the Mediterranean Sea between Sicily, Italy and Tunis, Tunisia.
Sheaf Crown	United Kingdom	World War II: Convoy DN 21: The cargo ship was torpedoed and damaged in the Indian Ocean (31°49′S 31°11′E) by U-160 (Kriegsmarine) with the loss of one of her 48 crew. She was abandoned, but was later towed to East London, Union of South Africa. Sheaf Crown was later repaired and returned to service.
T-514 Ost	Soviet Navy	The auxiliary minesweeper was sunk on this date.
Tokitsukaze	Imperial Japanese Navy	World War II: Battle of the Bismarck Sea: Operation 81-transport convoy: The Kagerō-class destroyer was bombed and damaged on 3 March with nineteen crewmen killed. Yukikaze (Imperial Japanese Navy) took off the commander of the 18th Army, Lieutenant General Adachi and his staff, the 150 soldiers, Commander Motokura and almost the entire crew were removed. She was left to drift. During the night Yukikaze returned and rescued twenty more survivors on board. She was bombed and damaged by a North American B-25 Mitchell aircraft, then bombed by Japanese dive bomber aircraft in an attempt to scuttle the vessel, but were unsuccessful. She was finally sunk in the Bismarck Sea near Finschhafen, New Guinea (07°15′S 148°30′E) by American North American B-25 Mitchell aircraft in the Huon Gulf (07°15′S 148°15′E). Nineteen of her crew were killed.
U-87	Kriegsmarine	World War II: The Type VIIB submarine was sunk in the Atlantic Ocean by HMCS Shediac and HMCS St. Croix (both Royal Canadian Navy) with the loss of all 50 crew.

== 5 March ==
List of shipwrecks: 5 March 1943
Ship	State	Description
Belluno	Italy	World War II: Tunisian campaign: The cargo ship was driven ashore during the evacuation of Tunisia. She was refloated.
Empire Tower	United Kingdom	World War II: Convoy XK 2: The cargo ship was torpedoed and sunk in the Atlantic Ocean north west of Lisbon, Portugal (43°50′N 14°46′W) by U-130 (Kriegsmarine) with the loss of 42 of her 45 crew. Survivors were rescued by HMT Loch Oskaig (Royal Navy).
Executive	United States	World War II: Convoy RA 53: The Design 1022 ship was torpedoed and damaged in the Norwegian Sea (72°44′N 11°27′E) by U-255 (Kriegsmarine) with the loss of nine of her 62 crew. Survivors were rescued by HMT Northern Pride and HMT St. Elstan (both Royal Navy). Executive was later scuttled by a Royal Navy destroyer.
Fidra	United Kingdom	World War II: Convoy XK 2: The cargo ship was torpedoed and sunk in the Atlantic Ocean (43°50′N 14°46′W) by U-130 (Kriegsmarine) with the loss of seventeen of her 29 crew. Survivors were rescued by HMS Coreopsis (Royal Navy).
Ger-y-Bryn	United Kingdom	World War II: Convoy XK 2: The cargo ship was torpedoed and sunk in the Atlantic Ocean (43°50′N 14°46′W) by U-130 (Kriegsmarine). Her 47 crew were rescued by HMS Coreopsis (Royal Navy). Ger-Y-Bryn was on a voyage from Lagos, Nigeria to Hull, Yorkshire.
USS Grampus	United States Navy	World War II: Battle of Blackett Strait: The Tambor-class submarine was sunk by gunfire off Kolombangara, Solomon Islands, by Minegumo and Murasame (both Imperial Japanese Navy). All 71 crew were killed.
Highway	United States	While towing the barge Mercer No. 1 (United States), the motor vessel was lost in Lynn Canal near Ralston Island. in the Alexander Archipelago, Territory of Alaska. Her entire crew – reported to be either six or seven people – perished. Wreckage from Highway was found on Ralston Island.
Mercer No. 1	United States	The barge was washed ashore at Lena Point, Territory of Alaska (58°23′45″N 134°46′45″W) after her towing vessel, the motor vessel Highway (United States), was lost with all hands in the Lynn Canal.
Minegumo	Imperial Japanese Navy	World War II: Battle of Blackett Strait: The Asashio-class destroyer was shelled and sunk in the Pacific Ocean off Vila, Solomon Islands (8°01′S 157°14′E) by ships of Task Force 68, United States Navy,^{[Note 1]} with the loss of 106 of her 230 crew.
Murasame	Imperial Japanese Navy	World War II: Battle of Blackett Strait: The Shiratsuyu-class destroyer was shelled and sunk in the Pacific Ocean off Vila, Solomon Islands (8°03′S 157°13′E) by ships of Task Force 68, United States Navy, with the loss of 128 of her 181 crew.
Richard Bland	United States	World War II: Convoy RA 53: The Liberty ship was torpedoed and damaged in the Atlantic Ocean north east of Iceland (72°44′N 11°27′E) by U-255 (Kriegsmarine) with the loss of 34 of her 69 crew. Survivors were rescued by HMS Impulsive or reached land in their lifeboat. Richard Bland was torpedoed on 10 March by U-255 and split in two. The stern section sank, the bow section was towed to Akureyri but was declared a total loss.
S 70	Kriegsmarine	World War II: The S 38 Type Schnellboot struck a mine and sank in the English Channel (42°41′N 2°49′W). Five of her crew were killed.
S 75	Kriegsmarine	World War II: The Type 1939/40 Schnellboot sank after an air attack by Supermarine Spitfire and Hawker Typhoon aircraft of the Royal Air Force. Eleven of her crew were killed.
Thomas Hooker	United States	World War II: Convoy ONS 168: The Liberty ship started to break in two in the Atlantic Ocean (53°20′N 47°00′W). Her 62 crew were rescued by HMS Pimpernel (Royal Navy). The drifting wreck was scuttled on 12 March by U-653 (Kriegsmarine).
Trefusis	United Kingdom	World War II: Convoy XK 2: The cargo ship was torpedoed and sunk in the Atlantic Ocean (43°50′N 14°46′W) by U-130 (Kriegsmarine) with the loss of three of her 47 crew. Survivors were rescued by HMS Coreopsis (Royal Navy).
Zarya	Soviet Navy	World War II: The auxiliary minelayer was sunk by a mine off Myskhako. At least seven of her crew were killed.
31-A-886	United States	The fishing vessel was wrecked in Herring Bay (56°48′10″N 132°58′00″W) near Petersburg, Territory of Alaska.

== 6 March ==
List of shipwrecks: 6 March 1943
Ship	State	Description
Bartolo	Spain	World War II: The cargo ship was torpedoed and sunk in the Mediterranean Sea off Duene, Bouches-du-Rhône, France by HMS Taurus (Royal Navy) with the loss of eight of her 30 crew.
DB-10	Soviet Navy	The No. 1-class landing boat was lost on this date.
Empire Kinsman	United Kingdom	World War II: The cargo ship was bombed and damaged at Murmansk, Soviet Union.
Engøy	Norway	World War II: The coaster struck a mine and sank at Sunnfjodleia.
Fort Battle River	United Kingdom	World War II: Convoy KMS 10: The Fort ship was torpedoed and sunk in the Atlantic Ocean (36°33′N 10°22′W) by U-410 (Kriegsmarine). All 65 people aboard were rescued by Empire Flamingo (United Kingdom) and HMCS Shediac (Royal Canadian Navy).
Kiriha Maru	Imperial Japanese Army	World War II: Convoy F-2: The British WWI Type C Class standard cargo ship was torpedoed and sunk in the Pacific Ocean 150 nautical miles (280 km; 170 mi) west of Manus Island, Admiralty Islands (00°37′N 145°30′E) by USS Triton (United States Navy). Four of her crew were killed. Survivors were rescued by Yūzuki (Imperial Japanese Navy).
M 4041 Dr. August Held	Kriegsmarine	World War II: The minesweeper struck a mine and sank at Le Verdon-sur-Mer, Gironde, France.
HMS ML 251	Royal Navy	World War II: The Fairmile B-class motor launch was rammed and sunk off Freetown, Sierra Leone, by HMS Burdock (Royal Navy) after being mistaken for a German submarine. There were no casualties.
PiLb-219	Kriegsmarine	World War II: The PiLb-40-class landing craft was sunk by a mine in the Black Sea off cap Tulsa (45°15′N 36°37′E). Ten of her crew and 53 of the 67 troops aboard were killed or reported missing.
Sperrbrecher 10 Vigo	Kriegsmarine	World War II: The sperrbrecher struck a mine in the North Sea with the loss of one life. She sank the next day at 53°59′N 7°09′E.
Thorstrand	Norway	World War II: The cargo ship was torpedoed and sunk in the Atlantic Ocean (41°23′N 42°59′W) by U-172 (Kriegsmarine) with the loss of four of the 47 people aboard.

== 7 March ==
List of shipwrecks: 7 March 1943
Ship	State	Description
Balzac	Regia Marina	World War II: The cargo ship was bombed and sunk in the Mediterranean Sea.
Ciclone	Regia Marina	World War II: The Ciclone-class torpedo boat struck two mines almost in the center of the Strait of Sicily (37°40′N 10°59′E). She was severely damaged and was abandoned by her crew. Fourteen or fifteen of her 158 crew died. Ciclone sank the next day.
Egyptian	United Kingdom	World War II: Convoy SC 121: The cargo ship was torpedoed and sunk in the Atlantic Ocean south east of Cape Farewell, Greenland (56°25′N 37°38′W) by U-230 (Kriegsmarine) with the loss of 46 of her 49 crew. Survivors were rescued by HMCS Rosthern (Royal Canadian Navy).
Empire Impala	United Kingdom	World War II: Convoy SC 121: The cargo ship straggled behind the convoy due to being ordered to rescue survivors from Egyptian (United Kingdom). She was torpedoed and sunk in the Atlantic Ocean (approximately 57°N 36°W) by U-591 (Kriegsmarine) with the loss of all 46 crew.
Empire Light	United Kingdom	World War II: Convoy ON 168: The tanker straggled behind the convoy. She was torpedoed and damaged in the Atlantic Ocean by U-638 (Kriegsmarine) with the loss of 45 of her 50 crew. Survivors were rescued by HMS Beverley (Royal Navy). Empire Light was torpedoed and sunk on 12 March (53°57′N 46°14′W) by U-468 (Kriegsmarine).
Henri Estier	France	World War II: The cargo ship struck a mine and sank in the Mediterranean Sea. Also reported as bombed and sunk north east of Zembra, Tunisia by British aircraft.
Ines Corraldo	Regia Marina	World War II: The cargo ship was bombed and sunk in the Mediterranean Sea southwest of Marettimo. All, or almost all, of the approximately 200 men aboard were rescued.
Jamaica	Norway	World War II: The refrigerated cargo ship was torpedoed and sunk in the Atlantic Ocean (approximately 52°N 27°W) by U-221 (Kriegsmarine) with the loss of 21 of her 38 crew. Some of the survivors were rescued by HMS Borage (Royal Navy) whilst others reached land in their lifeboats.
R 40	Kriegsmarine	World War II: The minesweeper struck a mine and sank in the English Channel off Boulogne, Pas-de-Calais, France.
Sabor	United Kingdom	World War II: The cargo ship was torpedoed and sunk in the Indian Ocean south east of Mossel Bay, Union of South Africa (34°30′S 23°10′E) by U-506 (Kriegsmarine) with the loss of seven of her 58 crew. Survivors were rescued by R-7 (South African Navy).
Tamesis	Norway	The cargo ship collided with Alcoa Guard (United States) and sank in the Atlantic Ocean 200 nautical miles (370 km; 230 mi) north east of Bermuda. All 66 people aboard were rescued by Richard H. Alvey (United States).

== 8 March ==
List of shipwrecks: 8 March 1943
Ship	State	Description
Empire Lakeland	United Kingdom	World War II: Convoy SC 121: The refrigerated cargo ship straggled behind the convoy. She was torpedoed and sunk in the Atlantic Ocean north west of Rockall, Inverness-shire (approximately 58°N 15°W) by U-190 (Kriegsmarine) with the loss of all 62 crew.
F 245	Kriegsmarine	The Type A Marinefahrprahm was wrecked on this date.
F 247	Kriegsmarine	The Type A Marinefahrprahm was wrecked on this date.
Fort Lamy	United Kingdom	World War II: Convoy SC 121: The cargo ship straggled behind the convoy. She was torpedoed and sunk in the Atlantic Ocean south east of Cape Farewell, Greenland (58°30′N 31°00′W) by U-527 (Kriegsmarine) with the loss of 46 of her 51 crew. Survivors were rescued by HMS Vervain (Royal Navy).
Guido	United Kingdom	World War II: Convoy SC 121: The cargo ship romped ahead of the convoy. She was torpedoed and sunk in the Atlantic Ocean 450 nautical miles (830 km; 520 mi) south east of Cape Farewell (58°08′N 32°20′W) by U-633 (Kriegsmarine) with the loss of 10 of her 45 crew. Survivors were rescued by USCGC Spencer ( United States Coast Guard).
Hisashima Maru	Japan	World War II: The cargo ship was torpedoed and sunk in the Pacific Ocean off Honshu by USS Permit (United States Navy).
USAT Jacob	United States Army	World War II: Operation Lilliput: The United States Army-chartered Dutch cargo ship was bombed and sunk by Japanese bomber aircraft off Porlock Harbor, New Guinea with the loss of five of those aboard. 158 survivors, crew and soldiers, were rescued by HMAS Bendigo, (Royal Australian Navy).
James B. Stephens	United States	World War II: The Liberty ship was torpedoed and sunk in the Indian Ocean off Durban, South Africa (28°35′S 33°18′E) by U-160 (Kriegsmarine) with the loss of one of her 63 crew. Survivors were rescued by HMS Nigella, HMT Norwich City (both Royal Navy) and a South African Air Force rescue boat.
J. L. M. Curry	United States	The Liberty ship broke in two and sank in the Atlantic Ocean off the coast of Iceland (66°53′N 14°17′W).
HMS LCT 2480	Royal Navy	World War II: The landing craft tank was being carried as deck cargo aboard Fort Lamy (United Kingdom) and was lost when that ship was torpedoed and sunk by U-527 (Kriegsmarine).
Leadgate	United Kingdom	World War II: Convoy SC 121: The cargo ship straggled behind the convoy. She was torpedoed and sunk in the Atlantic Ocean 450 nautical miles (830 km; 520 mi) west of Rockall (57°39′N 27°36′W) by U-642 (Kriegsmarine) with the loss of all 30 crew.
S 119	Kriegsmarine	World War II: The Type S 38 Schnellboot collided with S 114 (Kriegsmarine) off the Sunk Lightship (United Kingdom) during an attack on a Royal Navy destroyer. Her crew were rescued by S 114. She was scuttled by HMS MGB 20 (Royal Navy).
U-156	Kriegsmarine	World War II: The Type IXC submarine was depth charged and sunk in the Atlantic Ocean east of Barbados (12°38′N 54°39′W) by a Consolidated PBY Catalina aircraft of the United States Navy with the loss of all 53 crew.
U-633	Kriegsmarine	World War II: The submarine was sunk in the North Atlantic southwest of Iceland, in position 58°21′N 31°00′W, shortly after U-633 had torpedoed and sunk the freighter Guido. The submarine was sunk by depth charges from the U.S. Coast Guard cutter USCGC Spencer, which had rescued survivors from Guido. All 43 crew of U-633 were lost.
Vojvoda Putnik	Yugoslavia	World War II: Convoy SC 121: The cargo ship straggled behind the convoy due to problems with her steering gear. She was torpedoed and sunk in the Atlantic Ocean (58°42′N 31°25′W) by U-591 (Kriegsmarine) with the loss of all 44 crew.

== 9 March ==
List of shipwrecks: 9 March 1943
Ship	State	Description
Anfora	Italy	World War II: The cargo ship was set afire and scuttled at Mormugao, Portuguese India. She was refloated in 1948 and scrapped in 1949.
Bonneville	Norway	World War II: Convoy SC 121: The cargo ship was torpedoed and sunk in the Atlantic Ocean (58°48′N 22°00′W) by U-229 and/or U-405 (both Kriegsmarine) with the loss of 37 people including her Master, the Convoy Commodore and his staff, and crew. Survivors were rescued by USCGC Bibb ( United States Coast Guard) and Melrose Abbey (United Kingdom).
Braunfels	Germany	World War II: The cargo ship was scuttled at Mormugão. The wreck was subsequently broken up in situ.
Clarissa Radcliffe	United Kingdom	World War II: Convoy SC 122: The cargo ship straggled behind the convoy. She was torpedoed and sunk in the Atlantic Ocean by U-663 (Kriegsmarine) with the loss of all 52 crew.
Drachenfels	Germany	World War II: The cargo ship was scuttled at Mormugão. She was refloated in 1948 and was scrapped at Goa, Portuguese India, in 1950.
Ehrenfels	Germany	World War II: Operation Creek: The cargo ship was sunk with explosives by British raiders at Mormugão. Also reported as scuttled by her crew. The wreck was refloated in 1950 and scrapped.
Empire Standard	United Kingdom	World War II: The cargo ship was torpedoed and damaged in the Mediterranean Sea off Algiers, Algeria. She was placed under repair at Algiers but torpedoed and damaged on 26 March by Luftwaffe aircraft. Her back was broken and she was declared a constructive total loss. Empire Standard was towed out to sea and scuttled.
F 371	Kriegsmarine	World War II: The Type A Marinefahrprahm was sunk by a mine in the Black Sea.
James K. Polk	United States	World War II: Convoy BT 6: The Liberty ship was torpedoed and damaged in the Caribbean Sea 175 nautical miles (324 km; 201 mi) off Cayenne French Guiana (7°40′N 52°07′W) by U-510 (Kriegsmarine) with the loss of one of her 65 crew. All but eight of her crew were rescued by USS PC-592 (United States Navy). James K. Polk was towed to Trinidad by a British tug. She was towed to Mobile, Alabama, United States in March 1945 and was declared a constructive total loss.
James Smith	United States	World War II: Convoy BT 6: The Liberty ship was torpedoed and damaged in the Atlantic Ocean 175 nautical miles (324 km; 201 mi) north of Cayenne (7°40′N 52°07′W) by U-510 (Kriegsmarine) with the loss of eleven of her 58 crew. Survivors abandoned ship, although some of them reboarded her the next day. The other survivors were rescued by USS PC-592 (United States Navy). Those aboard James Smith were ordered to abandon her on 12 March, but she did not sink and was again reboarded. She was towed to Trinidad by HMS Zwarte Zee (Royal Navy). James Smith was subsequently repaired and returned to service.
Kelvinbank	United Kingdom	World War II: Convoy BT 6: The cargo ship was torpedoed and sunk in the Atlantic Ocean 200 nautical miles (370 km; 230 mi) north of Paramaribo, Surinam (7°24′N 52°11′W) by U-510 (Kriegsmarine) with the loss of 28 of her 60 crew. Survivors were rescued by George G. Meade (United States).
HMS LCT 2341	Royal Navy	World War II: Convoy SC 121: The landing craft tank was being transported as deck cargo aboard Bonneville (Norway) and was lost when that ship was torpedoed and sunk by a U-229 and/or U-405 (both Kriegsmarine).
Malantic	United States	World War II: Convoy SC 121: The cargo ship was torpedoed and sunk in the Atlantic Ocean (58°37′N 22°32′W) by U-409 (Kriegsmarine) with the loss of 27 of her 45 crew. Survivors were rescued by Melrose Abbey (United Kingdom).
Milos	Sweden	World War II: Convoy SC 121: The cargo ship straggled behind the convoy. She was torpedoed and sunk in the Atlantic Ocean (approximately 58°N 24°W) by U-530 (Kriegsmarine) with the loss of all 30 crew.
Puerto Rican	United States	World War II: Convoy RA 53: The cargo ship straggled behind the convoy. She was torpedoed and sunk in the Norwegian Sea north east of Iceland (66°44′N 10°41′W) by U-586 (Kriegsmarine) with the loss of 64 of her 65 crew. The survivor was rescued by HMT St Elstan (Royal Navy).
Rosewood	United Kingdom	World War II: Convoy SC 121: The tanker was torpedoed and damaged in the Atlantic Ocean south of Iceland (58°37′N 22°32′W) by U-409 (Kriegsmarine) with the loss of all 42 crew. The burning wreck broke in two. Both sections were scuttled on 11 March at 58°30′N 20°31′W by USCGC Bibb ( United States Coast Guard).
Tabor	Norway	World War II: The cargo ship was torpedoed, shelled and sunk in the Indian Ocean (38°30′S 23°10′E) by U-506 (Kriegsmarine) with the loss of twelve of her 46 crew.
Thomas Ruffin	United States	World War II: Convoy BT 6: The Liberty ship was torpedoed and damaged in the Atlantic Ocean 175 nautical miles (324 km; 201 mi) north of Cayenne (7°40′N 52°07′W) by U-510 (Kriegsmarine) with the loss of six of her 58 crew. Survivors abandoned ship and were rescued by USS Courage and USS PC-592 (both United States Navy). Thomas Ruffin was towed to Port of Spain, Trinidad by HMS Milford (Royal Navy). She was later towed to Mobile, Alabama, where she was declared a constructive total loss.

== 10 March ==
List of shipwrecks: 10 March 1943
Ship	State	Description
Andrea F. Luckenbach	United States	World War II: Convoy HX 228: The cargo ship was torpedoed and sunk in the Atlantic Ocean (51°20′N 29°29′W) by U-221 (Kriegsmarine) with the loss of 20 of the 84 people aboard. Survivors were rescued by RFA Orangeleaf (Royal Fleet Auxiliary).
Coulmore	United Kingdom	World War II: Convoy SC 121: The cargo ship was torpedoed and damaged in the Atlantic Ocean (58°48′N 22°00′W) by U-229 (Kriegsmarine) with the loss of 25 of her 43 crew. Survivors abandoned ship and were rescued by USCGC Bibb ( United States Coast Guard) and HMCS Dauphin (Royal Canadian Navy). USCGC Bibb took Coulmore in tow, reaching the Clyde on 23 March. She was subsequently repaired, and returned to service in July 1943.
Derna	Italy	World War II: The cargo ship was torpedoed and sunk in the Mediterranean Sea by HMS Taurus (Royal Navy). One of her crew was reported missing, there were 49 survivors.
James Sprunt	United States	World War II: Convoy KG 123: The Liberty ship was torpedoed and sunk in the Caribbean Sea off Guantánamo Bay, Cuba (19°49′N 74°38′W) by U-185 (Kriegsmarine) with the loss of all 69 crew.
Kaijo Maru	Imperial Japanese Navy	World War II: The fleet oiler was bombed and damaged by Consolidated B-24 Liberator aircraft of the United States Army Air Force south of Buton Passage, Celebes Islands (4°45′S 123°10′E). She was beached on Landaila Reef and abandoned. There were no casualties. Kaijo Maru was torpedoed on 17 March by USS Tautog (United States Navy to prevent salvage by the Japanese.
HMS MGB 622	Royal Navy	World War II: The motor gun boat was shelled and sunk off Terschelling, Friesland, Netherlands by Kriegsmarine warships. Fifteen of her 25 crew were killed, and the survivors were captured.
Nailsea Court	United Kingdom	World War II: Convoy SC 121: The cargo ship was torpedoed and sunk in the Atlantic Ocean south of Reykjavík, Iceland (58°45′N 21°57′W) by U-229 (Kriegsmarine) with the loss of 45 of her 49 crew. Survivors were rescued by HMCS Dauphin (Royal Canadian Navy) and Melrose Abbey (United Kingdom).
Passau	Germany	World War II: The cargo ship was shelled and sunk in the South Atlantic by USS Eberle and USS Savannah (both United States Navy).
Richard D. Spaight	United States	World War II: The Liberty ship was torpedoed, shelled and sunk in the Mozambique Channel 350 nautical miles (650 km; 400 mi) north east of Durban, Union of South Africa (28°00′S 37°00′E) by U-182 (Kriegsmarine) with the loss of one of her 67 crew.
Rosario	Italy	World War II: The tanker was torpedoed and sunk in the Mediterranean Sea 4 nautical miles (7.4 km; 4.6 mi) north east of Punta Milazzo, Sicily by HMS Trooper (Royal Navy).
Tucurinca	United Kingdom	World War II: Convoy HX 228: The cargo ship was torpedoed and sunk in the Atlantic Ocean south east of Cape Farewell, Greenland (51°00′N 30°10′W) by U-211 (Kriegsmarine) with the loss of one of the 81 people aboard. Survivors were rescued by Roselys (Free French Naval Forces).
Virginia Sinclair	United States	World War II: Convoy KG 123: The tanker was torpedoed and sunk in the Caribbean Sea off Cape Maysi, Cuba (20°11′N 74°04′W) by U-185 (Kriegsmarine with the loss of seven of her 44 crew. Survivors were rescued by USS SC-742 (United States Navy).
YC-1278	United States Navy	The unpowered covered lighter was lost off the Atlantic coast of the United States.

== 11 March ==
List of shipwrecks: 11 March 1943
Ship	State	Description
Aelybryn	United Kingdom	World War II: The cargo ship was sunk by torpedo in the Indian Ocean off the coast of Natal (29°08′S 34°05′E) by U-160 (Kriegsmarine) with the loss of nine of her 41 crew. Lourenço Marques (Portugal) rescued 32 survivors.
Baron Kinnaird	United Kingdom	World War II: Convoy ONS 169: The cargo ship straggled behind the convoy. She was torpedoed and sunk in the Atlantic Ocean north west of Belle Isle, Dominion of Newfoundland (53°15′N 43°50′W) by U-622 (Kriegsmarine) with the loss of all 42 crew.
Brant County	Norway	World War II: Convoy HX 228: The cargo ship was torpedoed and sunk in the Atlantic Ocean (52°05′N 27°35′W) by U-86 (Kriegsmarine) with the loss of 36 of the 58 people aboard. Survivors were rescued by Stuart Prince (United Kingdom).
Caribsea	United States	World War II: The cargo ship was torpedoed and sunk in the Atlantic Ocean (34°35′N 76°18′W) by U-158 (Kriegsmarine) with the loss of 21 crew. There were seven survivors.
HMS Harvester	Royal Navy	World War II: Convoy HX 228: The H-class destroyer was torpedoed and sunk in the Atlantic Ocean by U-444 (Kriegsmarine) with the loss of 145 crew and 39 survivors of William C Gorgas (United States).
Karin	Kriegsmarine	World War II: The blockade runner was intercepted in the Atlantic Ocean by USS Eberle and USS Savannah (both United States Navy). A boarding party from USS Eberle was placed on the ship, which was sunk by explosives killing eleven crew from USS Eberle. The remaining three members of the boarding party and her 72 crew were rescued by USS Savannah.
HMS LCT 2398	Royal Navy	World War II: Convoy HX 228: The landing craft tank was lost as deck cargo aboard William C. Gorgas (United States) when that ship was torpedoed and sunk by U-767 (Kriegsmarine).
M 4620 Harvestehude	Kriegsmarine	World War II: The naval trawler/auxiliary minesweeper was torpedoed and sunk by MTB 94 and MTB 96 (both Free French Naval Forces) off Morlaix, Finistère, France (48°56′N 03°38′W) with the loss of 30 lives.
Olancho	Honduras	World War II: The cargo ship was torpedoed and sunk in the Gulf of Mexico 30 nautical miles (56 km; 35 mi) west of Cape San Antonio, Cuba (22°08′N 85°14′W) by U-183 (Kriegsmarine) with the loss of three of her 46 crew. Survivors were rescued by USS Absecon (United States Navy) and Choluteca (Honduras).
U-432	Kriegsmarine	World War II: The Type VIIC submarine was depth charged, rammed and sunk by in the Atlantic Ocean (51°35′N 28°20′W) Aconit (Free French Naval Forces) with the loss of 26 of her 46 crew.
U-444	Kriegsmarine	World War II: The Type VIIC submarine was depth charged, rammed and sunk in the Atlantic Ocean (51°14′N 29°18′W) by Aconit (Free French Naval Forces) and HMS Harvester (Royal Navy) with the loss of 41 of her 45 crew.
William C Gorgas	United States	World War II: Convoy HX 228: The Liberty ship was torpedoed and sunk in the Atlantic Ocean (51°35′N 28°30′W) by U-767 (Kriegsmarine) with the loss of 22 of her 73 crew. Survivors were rescued by HMS Harvester (Royal Navy), but only twelve of them survived the sinking of that ship.

== 12 March ==
List of shipwrecks: 12 March 1943
Ship	State	Description
Dalila	Germany	World War II: The cargo ship was torpedoed and sunk in the English Channel off Gravelines, Pas-de-Calais, France by HMMTB 24, HMMTB 35 and HMMTB 38 (all Royal Navy).
Esterel	France	World War II: The cargo ship was torpedoed and sunk in the Mediterranean Sea off Milazzo, Sicily, Italy by HMS Thunderbolt (Royal Navy).
HMS Lightning	Royal Navy	World War II: The L-class destroyer was torpedoed and sunk in the Mediterranean Sea off the coast of Algeria by S 55 and S 158 (both Kriegsmarine). Forty-five of her crew were killed.
R 74	Kriegsmarine	World War II: The Type R 41 minesweeper struck a mine and sank in the English Channel off Boulogne, Pas-de-Calais, France.
Taihosan Maru	Imperial Japanese Navy	World War II: The Tokiwasan Maru-class auxiliary water tanker was torpedoed and sunk in the Pacific Ocean south of Ponape, Caroline Islands (7°15′N 158°45′E) by USS Plunger (United States Navy). Five of her crew were killed.
HMS Turbulent	Royal Navy	World War II: The T-class submarine struck a mine and sank in the Mediterranean Sea off La Maddelena, Sardinia, Italy with the loss of all 61 crew.
U-130	Kriegsmarine	World War II: The Type IX submarine was depth charged and sunk in the Atlantic Ocean (37°10′N 20°21′W) by USS Champlin (United States Navy) with the loss of all 53 crew.

== 13 March ==
List of shipwrecks: 13 March 1943
Ship	State	Description
Ceres	Netherlands	World War II: Convoy GAT 49: The cargo ship was torpedoed and sunk in the Caribbean Sea (14°50′N 71°46′W) by U-68 (Kriegsmarine) with the loss of two of her 37 crew. Survivors were rescued by one of the escort vessels.
Cities Service Missouri	United States	World War II: Convoy GAT 49: The tanker was torpedoed and sunk in the Caribbean Sea (14°50′N 71°46′W) by U-68 (Kriegsmarine) with the loss of two of her 54 crew. Survivors were rescued by USS Biddle (United States Navy).
Clan Alpine	United Kingdom	World War II: Convoy OS 44: The cargo ship was torpedoed and damaged in the Atlantic Ocean 190 nautical miles (350 km; 220 mi) west of Cape Finisterre, Spain (42°45′N 13°31′W) by U-107 (Kriegsmarine) with the loss of 28 of her 94 crew. Survivors were rescued by HMS Scarborough (Royal Navy), which scuttled Clan Alpine.
Djambi	Netherlands	The cargo ship collided with Silverbeech (United Kingdom) and sank in the Atlantic Ocean. Her crew survived.
Empress of Canada	United Kingdom	World War II: The troopship was torpedoed and sunk in the Atlantic Ocean 400 nautical miles (740 km; 460 mi) south of Cape Palmas, Liberia (1°13′S 9°57′W) by Leonardo da Vinci (Regia Marina) with the loss of 392 of the 1,752 people on board.
Hermod	Sweden	World War II: The cargo ship was torpedoed and sunk in the North Sea off Terschelling, Friesland, Netherlands by Royal Navy motor torpedo boats. Three men and one woman were killed from a crew of eighteen men and two women.
Kasuga Maru No. 2 Go	Imperial Japanese Navy	World War II: The Kasuga Maru-class auxiliary transport was torpedoed and sunk in Port Blair Harbor, Andaman Islands (11°40′N 92°50′E) by HNLMS O 21 (Royal Netherlands Navy). Twenty-one of her crew were killed.
Keystone	United States	World War II: Convoy UGS 6: The Design 1013 ship straggled behind the convoy. She was torpedoed and sunk in the Atlantic Ocean 450 nautical miles (830 km; 520 mi) west of the Azores, Portugal (37°59′N 37°40′W) by U-172 (Kriegsmarine) with the loss of a gunner and a crew member. Survivors were rescued by Sines (Portugal).
Kosei Maru	Japan	World War II: The cargo ship was torpedoed and sunk in the East China Sea by USS Sunfish (United States Navy).
Liège	Germany	World War II: The cargo ship struck a mine and sank in the North Sea off Terschelling, or was shelled and sunk by Royal Navy vessels.
Marcella	United Kingdom	World War II: Convoy OS 44: The cargo ship was torpedoed and sunk in the Atlantic Ocean 190 nautical miles (350 km; 220 mi) west of Cape Finisterre (42°45′N 13°31′W by U-107 (Kriegsmarine) with the loss of all 44 crew.
Momoyama Maru	Imperial Japanese Army	World War II: Convoy Hansa No. 1: The British WWI B-class standard cargo ship was bombed off Wewak, New Guinea (03°05′S 143°28′E) by Boeing B-17 Flying Fortress aircraft of the United States Fifth Air Force and was set afire. The ship was abandoned with nine crew killed. She was scuttled by a torpedo from Akigumo (Imperial Japanese Navy), sinking just after midnight on 14 March (02°45′S 143°20′E).
M. Ö. 697	Sweden	World War II: The motor fishing vessel was sunk by a mine in the Øresund. Both crew were killed.
No. 92	Soviet Navy	The G-5-class motor torpedo boat was lost on this date.
Ocean Freedom	United Kingdom	World War II: The Ocean ship was bombed and sunk at Murmansk, Soviet Union by Luftwaffe aircraft. She was refloated on 1 June and beached, but was subsequently scrapped.
Oporto	United Kingdom	World War II: Convoy OS 44: The cargo ship was torpedoed and sunk in the Atlantic Ocean 190 nautical miles (350 km; 220 mi) west of Cape Finisterre (42°45′N 13°31′W by U-107 (Kriegsmarine) with the loss of 43 of her 47 crew. Survivors were rescued by HMS Spiraea (Royal Navy).
Portland	Germany	World War II: The cargo ship was intercepted in the Atlantic Ocean (6°12′N 21°45′W) by Georges Leygues (French Navy) and was scuttled by her crew.
Sembilangan	Netherlands	World War II: Convoy OS 44: The cargo ship was torpedoed and sunk in the Atlantic Ocean 190 nautical miles (350 km; 220 mi) west of Cape Finisterre (42°45′N 13°31′W by U-107 (Kriegsmarine) with the loss of 86 of her 87 crew. The survivor was rescued by HMS Spiraea (Royal Navy).
TK-94	Soviet Navy	World War II: The motor torpedo boat was sunk at Anapa Bay by German coastal defenses.
U-163	Kriegsmarine	World War II: The Type IXC submarine was depth charged and sunk in the Atlantic Ocean north west of Cape Finisterre (45°05′N 15°00′W) by HMCS Prescott (Royal Canadian Navy) with the loss of all 57 crew.

== 14 March ==
List of shipwrecks: 14 March 1943
Ship	State	Description
Caraïbe	Germany	World War II: The cargo ship was torpedoed and sunk in the Mediterranean Sea 10 nautical miles (19 km; 12 mi) north west of Marettimo, Sicily, Italy (38°02′N 11°54′E) by aircraft based on Malta. Generale Antonino Cascino and Pegaso (both Regia Marina) rescued 63 survivors of the approximately 100 men aboard.
Città di Bergamo	Italy	World War II: The cargo ship was torpedoed and sunk in the Mediterranean Sea by HMS Unbending (Royal Navy). There were no casualties.
F 136	Kriegsmarine	World War II: The Type A Marinefahrprahm was sunk by a mine in the Kerch Strait. Twelve of her thirteen crew were killed.
HMT Moravia	Royal Navy	World War II: The 130.2-foot (39.7 m), 307-ton minesweeping naval trawler struck a mine and sank in the North Sea about ten nautical miles (19 km; 12 mi) east south east of Orfordness, Suffolk (52°03′N 01°48′E) with the loss of one of her 29 crew.
HMT Moray	Royal Navy	The 115.4-foot (35.2 m), 206-ton Strath-class victualling vessel/naval trawler foundered off St. Ann's Head, Pembrokeshire in heavy seas.
HNoMS MTB 631	Royal Norwegian Navy	World War II: Operation Brandy: The Fairmile D motor torpedo boat ran aground at Florø, Norway and had to be abandoned, her crew going aboard HNoMS MTB 619 (Royal Norwegian Navy). She was later salvaged by the Germans and put into service as S 631.
Optima	Germany	World War II: Operation Brandy: The cargo ship was torpedoed and sunk by HNoMS MTB 619 and HNoMS MTB 631 (both Royal Norwegian Navy) off Florø. Three of her crew were reported missing.
Pegli	Italy	World War II: The cargo ship was torpedoed and sunk in the Bay of Palermo (38°14′N 13°13′E) by HMS Sibyl (Royal Navy). Four of her 40 crew were killed.
HMS Thunderbolt	Royal Navy	World War II: The T-class submarine was depth charged and sunk in the Mediterranean Sea off Sicily by Cicogna (Regia Marina) with the loss of all 62 crew.

== 15 March ==
List of shipwrecks: 15 March 1943
Ship	State	Description
Castor	Germany	World War II: The icebreaker struck a mine and sank in the North Sea off Warnemünde.
Egenia Chandri	Greece	World War II: The cargo ship struck the wreck of Oslofjord (Norway) and was beached on the Herd Sands, off the mouth of the River Tyne. She was a total loss.
F 475	Kriegsmarine	World War II: The Type A Marinefahrprahm was sunk by a mine in the Black Sea.
Hontesroom	Netherlands	The cargo ship foundered off the coast of Iceland.
HMS LCV 584	Royal Navy	The landing craft vehicle was sunk off Inellan.
Momoha Maru	Imperial Japanese Army	World War II: The British WWI C-class standard cargo ship was torpedoed and sunk in the Pacific Ocean (00°02′S 145°05′E) by USS Trigger (United States Navy). Survivors were rescued by CH-23 (Imperial Japanese Navy).
Ocean Seaman	United Kingdom	World War II: The Ocean ship was torpedoed and damaged in the Mediterranean Sea (36°55′N 1°59′E) by U-380 (Kriegsmarine). She was beached at Algiers, Algeria but was declared a total loss.
USS Triton	United States Navy	World War II: The Tambor-class submarine was shelled and sunk in the Pacific Ocean off Kairiru Island, New Guinea (3°20′10″S 143°33′0″E) by CH-24, Akikaze and Satsuki (all Imperial Japanese Navy) with the loss of all 60 crew.
Wyoming	France	World War II: Convoy UGS 6: The cargo ship was torpedoed and sunk in the Atlantic Ocean (40°18′N 28°56′W) by U-524 (Kriegsmarine). All 127 people aboard were rescued by USS Champlin (United States Navy).

== 16 March ==
List of shipwrecks: 16 March 1943
Ship	State	Description
Agnete	Denmark	World War II: The cargo ship was torpedoed and sunk in the North Sea off Terschelling, Friesland, Netherlands by HMMTB 88 and HMMTB 93 (both Royal Navy). All eighteen crew were rescued by a German minesweeper.
Benjamin Harrison	United States	World War II: Convoy UGS 6: The Liberty ship was torpedoed and damaged in the Atlantic Ocean (39°02′N 24°15′W) by U-172 (Kriegsmarine) with the loss of three of her 72 crew. Survivors were rescued by Alan-a-Dale (Panama) and USS Rowan (United States Navy), which scuttled the ship.
HMT Campobello	Royal Navy	World War II: Convoy SC 122: The Isles-class trawler developed severe leaks and was scuttled by HMS Godetia (Royal Navy) after her crew had been rescued.
Capo Orso	Italy	World War II: The cargo ship was bombed and sunk in the Mediterranean Sea (37°40′N 12°07′E) by British aircraft.
Elin K.	Norway	World War II: Convoy HX 229: The cargo ship was torpedoed and sunk in the Atlantic Ocean (50°38′N 34°46′W) by U-603 (Kriegsmarine). Her 40 crew were rescued by HMS Pennywort (Royal Navy).
F 153A	Kriegsmarine	The MFP-A landing craft was sunk on this date.
Giacomo Medici	Regia Marina	World War II: The La Masa-class torpedo boat was sunk in an air raid on Catania, Sicily by United States Army Air Force aircraft.
Hadleigh	United Kingdom	World War II: Convoy ET 14: The cargo ship was torpedoed and damaged in the Mediterranean Sea north west of Oran, Algeria (36°10′N 0°30′W) by U-77 (Kriegsmarine) with the loss of two of her 52 crew. Survivors were rescued by HMS Tynedale (Royal Navy). Hadleigh was taken in tow by the tug HMS Restive (Royal Navy) and beached at Mers El Kébir, Algeria. She later broke in two and was declared a total loss.
HMS Horsa	Royal Navy	The Assurance-class tug ran aground near Osfles Rock, Iceland and was wrecked. Her crew were rescued by the naval trawler HMT Bute (Royal Navy).
Johannisberger	Germany	World War II: The cargo ship was torpedoed by M-122 (Soviet Navy) and beached off Kirkenes, Norway with the loss of all hands. She was a total loss.
Maria Toft	Denmark	World War II: The cargo ship was torpedoed and sunk in the North Sea off Terschelling by HMMTB 88 and HMMTB 93 (both Royal Navy). Her nineteen crew were rescued.
Merchant Prince	United Kingdom	World War II: Convoy ET 14: The cargo ship was torpedoed and damaged in the Mediterranean Sea north west of Oran (36°10′N 0°30′W) by U-77 (Kriegsmarine) with the loss of one of her 51 crew. She was abandoned, but was reboarded the next day and beached at Oran. Later repaired and returned to service.
Normandie	Sweden	World War II: The fishing boat (17 GRT) was sunk by a mine in the Kattegat. Her crew were rescued by other fishing boats.
Oscilla	Netherlands	World War II: The cargo ship was torpedoed, shelled and sunk in the Atlantic Ocean (19°15′N 60°25′W) by Morosini (Regia Marina) with the loss of four of her 55 crew.
SF 153	Luftwaffe	World War II: The Siebel ferry was bombed and sunk in the Mediterranean Sea between Sicily and Tunisia.
SF 154	Luftwaffe	World War II: The Siebel ferry was bombed and sunk in the Mediterranean Sea between Sicily and Tunisia.
UJ 2209 Minerva	Kriegsmarine	World War II: The auxiliary submarine chaser was sunk by Allied aircraft.

== 17 March ==
List of shipwrecks: 17 March 1943
Ship	State	Description
Alderamin	Netherlands	World War II: Convoy SC 122: The cargo ship was torpedoed and damaged in the Atlantic Ocean (52°14′N 32°15′W) by U-338 (Kriegsmarine) with the loss of fifteen of her 64 crew. She later sank at 51°30′N 34°55′W.
Coracero	United Kingdom	World War II: Convoy HX 229: The refrigerated cargo ship was torpedoed and sunk in the Atlantic Ocean (51°04′N 33°20′W) by U-384 (Kriegsmarine) with the loss of five of the 58 people aboard. Survivors were rescued by HMS Mansfield (Royal Navy).
Devoli	Italy	World War II: The tanker was torpedoed and sunk six nautical miles (11 km; 6.9 mi) off Cape San Vito by HMS Splendid (Royal Navy) with the loss of fourteen of her 32 crew.
Forli	Italy	World War II: The cargo ship was torpedoed and sunk in the Mediterranean Sea by HMS Trooper (Royal Navy). There were ten missing and sixteen survivors.
Fort Cedar Lake	United Kingdom	World War II: Convoy SC 122: The Fort ship, on her maiden voyage, straggled behind the convoy. She was torpedoed and damaged in the Atlantic Ocean south east of Cape Farewell, Greenland (52°14′N 32°15′W) by U-338 (Kriegsmarine). She was later torpedoed and sunk by U-665 (Kriegsmarine). Her 50 crew were rescued by Zamalek (United Kingdom).
Granville	Panama	World War II: Convoy SC 122: The cargo ship was torpedoed and sunk in the Atlantic Ocean (52°50′N 30°35′W) by U-338 (Kriegsmarine) with the loss of thirteen of her 47 crew. Survivors were rescued by HMS Lavender (Royal Navy).
Harry Luckenbach	United States	World War II: Convoy HX 229: The cargo ship was torpedoed and sunk in the Atlantic Ocean (50°38′N 34°46′W) by U-91 (Kriegsmarine) with the loss of all 80 crew.
Irénée Du Pont	United States	World War II: Convoy HX 229: The Type C2 cargo ship straggled behind the convoy. She was torpedoed and sunk in the Atlantic Ocean (50°38′N 34°46′W) by U-91 (Kriegsmarine) with the loss of fourteen of the 84 people aboard. Survivors were rescued by HMS Mansfield (Royal Navy) and Tekoa (United Kingdom).
James Oglethorpe	United States	World War II: Convoy HX 229: The Liberty ship was torpedoed and damaged in the Atlantic Ocean (50°38′N 34°46′W) by U-758 (Kriegsmarine). Some of those aboard abandoned ship and were either drowned or rescued by HMS Pennywort (Royal Navy). An attempt was made to sail James Oglethorpe to St. John's, Dominion of Newfoundland but she either foundered or was sunk by a coup de grâce from U-91 (Kriegsmarine). Forty-four of the 74 people aboard were lost.
King Gruffydd	United Kingdom	World War II: Convoy SC 122: The cargo ship was torpedoed and sunk in the Atlantic Ocean south east of Cape Farewell (51°55′N 32°41′W) by U-338 (Kriegsmarine) with the loss of 24 of her 49 crew. Survivors were rescued by Zamalek (United Kingdom).
Kingsbury	United Kingdom	World War II: Convoy SC 122: The cargo ship was torpedoed and sunk in the Atlantic Ocean (51°55′N 32°41′W) by U-338 (Kriegsmarine) with the loss of four of her 48 crew. Survivors were rescued by Zamalek (United Kingdom).
Nariva	United Kingdom	World War II: Convoy HX 229: The cargo ship straggled behind the convoy. She was torpedoed and damaged in the Atlantic Ocean (50°34′N 35°02′W) by U-600 and U-91 (both Kriegsmarine). Her 94 crew were rescued by HMS Anemone and HMS Mansfield (both Royal Navy) before the former scuttled Nariva.
Port Auckland	United Kingdom	World War II: Convoy SC 122: The cargo ship was torpedoed and sunk in the Atlantic Ocean (52°25′N 30°15′W) by U-305 (Kriegsmarine) with the loss of eight of the 118 people aboard. Survivors were rescued by HMS Godetia (Royal Navy).
USS PT-67	United States Navy	The Elco 77' PT boat was destroyed by fire in a refueling accident at Tufi, New Guinea (09°02′S 149°20′E). There were no casualties.
USS PT-119	United States Navy	The Elco 80' PT boat was destroyed by fire in a refueling accident at Tufi, New Guinea (09°02′S 149°20′E). There were no casualties.
SKA-088	Soviet Navy	World War II: The MO-4 Type minesweeper was sunk by a mine off Myskhako with the loss of 20 lives. There were 3 survivors.
Southern Princess	United Kingdom	World War II: Convoy HX 229: The whaling factory ship was torpedoed and sunk in the Atlantic Ocean (50°36′N 34°30′W) by U-600 (Kriegsmarine) with the loss of six of her 199 crew. Survivors were rescued by Tekoa (United Kingdom).
Terkoelei	Netherlands	World War II: Convoy HX 229: The cargo ship was torpedoed and sunk in the Atlantic Ocean (51°45′N 31°15′W) by U-631 (Kriegsmarine) with the loss of 36 of her 97 crew. Survivors were rescued by HMS Mansfield (Royal Navy).
William Eustis	United States	World War II: Convoy HX 229: The Liberty ship was torpedoed and damaged in the Atlantic Ocean (50°10′N 35°02′W) by U-435 (Kriegsmarine). Her 72 crew were rescued by HMS Volunteer (Royal Navy), which scuttled the ship.
Zaanland	Netherlands	World War II: Convoy HX 229: The cargo ship was torpedoed and sunk in the Atlantic Ocean (50°38′N 34°46′W) by U-758 (Kriegsmarine). Her 53 crew were rescued by the convoy's escorts.
Zouave	United Kingdom	World War II: Convoy SC 122: The cargo ship was torpedoed and sunk in the Atlantic Ocean (52°25′N 30°15′W) by U-305 (Kriegsmarine) with the loss of thirteen of her 43 crew. Survivors were rescued by HMS Godetia (Royal Navy).

== 18 March ==
List of shipwrecks: 18 March 1943
Ship	State	Description
Canadian Star	United Kingdom	World War II: Convoy HX 229: The cargo ship was torpedoed and sunk in the Atlantic Ocean south east of Cape Farewell, Greenland (53°24′N 28°34′W) by U-221 (Kriegsmarine) with the loss of 34 of the 84 people aboard. Survivors were rescued by HMS Anemone and HMS Pennywort (both Royal Navy).
Clarissa Radcliffe	United Kingdom	World War II: Convoy SC 122: The cargo ship straggled behind the convoy. She was torpedoed and sunk in the Atlantic Ocean 700 nautical miles (1,300 km; 810 mi) west of Cape Farewell (52°21′N 27°15′W) by U-663 (Kriegsmarine) with the loss of all 55 crew.
Dafila	United Kingdom	World War II: The cargo ship was torpedoed and sunk in the Mediterranean Sea off Derna, Libya (32°59′N 22°21′E) by U-593 (Kriegsmarine) with the loss of 22 of her 37 crew. Survivors were rescued by HMSAS Southern Maid (South African Navy).
Kaying	United Kingdom	World War II: The radio ship was torpedoed and sunk in the Mediterranean Sea off Derna (32°59′N 22°21′E) by U-593 (Kriegsmarine) with the loss of nine of her 81 crew.
Molly Pitcher	United States	World War II: Convoy UGS 6: The Liberty ship, on her maiden voyage, straggled behind the convoy. She was torpedoed and damaged in the Atlantic Ocean 500 nautical miles (930 km; 580 mi) west of Lisbon, Portugal (38°23′N 19°54′W) by U-167 (Kriegsmarine) with the loss of four of her 70 crew. Survivors were rescued by USS Champlin, USS Rowan (both United States Navy) and William Johnson (United States). Molly Pitcher was later sunk by U-521 (Kriegsmarine).
Walter Q. Gresham	United States	World War II: Convoy HX 229: The Liberty ship was torpedoed and sunk in the Atlantic Ocean south east of Cape Farewell (53°35′N 28°05′W) by U-221 (Kriegsmarine) with the loss of 28 of the 70 people aboard. Survivors were rescued by HMS Anemone and HMS Pennywort (both Royal Navy).

== 19 March ==
List of shipwrecks: 19 March 1943
Ship	State	Description
Carras	Greece	World War II: Convoy SC 122: The cargo ship straggled behind the convoy. She was torpedoed and damaged in the Atlantic Ocean (54°05′N 24°19′W) by U-666 (Kriegsmarine). All 34 crew were rescued by Zamalek (United Kingdom). Carras was later scuttled by U-333 (Kriegsmarine).
HMS Derwent	Royal Navy	World War II: The Hunt-class destroyer was struck by a "Motobomba" torpedo dropped by a Regia Aeronautica aircraft in the harbor at Tripoli, Libya, and was beached to prevent her from sinking. Six of her crew were killed. She underwent temporary repairs and was towed to the United Kingdom, but her repairs were never completed, and she was scrapped in 1947.
Glendalough	United Kingdom	World War II: The cargo ship struck a mine and sank in the North Sea. Five of her sixteen crew were lost.
Kowa Maru	Imperial Japanese Army	World War II: The Kowa Maru-class transport ship was torpedoed and sunk south of Darien, China (38°34′N 122°13′E) by USS Wahoo (United States Navy). Sixteen of her crew were killed.
Lulworth Hill	United Kingdom	World War II: The cargo ship was torpedoed and sunk in the South Atlantic Ocean (10°10′S 01°00′E) by the submarine Leonardo da Vinci (Regia Marina). Of the fourteen crew members who survived the sinking initially, one was rescued by Leonardo da Vinci and the rest were left adrift on a life raft, with only two of them surviving to be rescued 50 days later by HMS Rapid (Royal Navy) on 9 May 1943. The Tower Hill Memorial lists 37 dead for this sinking, 28 on the day of the sinking and nine in April. Lulworth Hill was on a voyage from Mauritius to Liverpool, Lancashire.
Mathew Luckenbach	United States	World War II: Convoy HX 229: The cargo ship straggled behind the convoy. She was torpedoed and damaged in the Atlantic Ocean by U-527 (Kriegsmarine) and was abandoned by her 68 crew. They were rescued by USCGC Ingham ( United States Coast Guard). Mathew Luckenbach was later torpedoed and sunk at 54°23′N 23°34′W by U-523 (Kriegsmarine).
Ocean Voyager	United Kingdom	World War II: The Ocean ship was sunk at Tripoli by Junkers Ju 88 aircraft of Kampfgeschwader 30, Kampfgeschwader 54 and Kampfgeschwader 77, Luftwaffe. This was the Luftwaffe's first mass attack utilizing Italian design Motobomba circling torpedoes. Five of her crew were killed.
Takachiho Maru	Japan	World War II: The cargo liner was torpedoed and sunk in the Formosa Strait off North Keelung, Formosa, China (25°50′N 122°30′E) by USS Kingfish (United States Navy) with the loss of 98 crew and 741 passengers, or with 844 passengers, crew and troops killed.
TKA-35	Soviet Navy	The G-5-class motor torpedo boat sank after a collision with TKA-65 off Myskhako.
U-5	Kriegsmarine	The Type IIB submarine sank in the Baltic Sea near Pillau in a diving accident with the loss of sixteen of her 37 crew.
U-384	Kriegsmarine	World War II: The Type VIIC submarine was depth charged and sunk in the Atlantic Ocean (54°18′N 26°15′W) by a Boeing B-17 Flying Fortress aircraft of 206 Squadron, Royal Air Force with the loss of all 47 crew.
Varvara	Greece	World War II: The cargo ship was bombed and damaged at Tripoli by Junkers Ju 88 aircraft of Kampfgeschwader 30 and Kampfgeschwader 77, Luftwaffe. She was consequently declared a total loss. Two of her crew were killed.
Zogen Maru	Japan	World War II: The cargo ship was torpedoed and sunk in the Yellow Sea by USS Wahoo (United States Navy) with the loss of all hands.

== 20 March ==
List of shipwrecks: 20 March 1943
Ship	State	Description
Alida	Netherlands	The trawler was sunk in a collision with the trawler Hondo (United Kingdom) off the seaward side of the Morecambe Bay lightship in dense fog.
Bourghieh	Egypt	World War II: The sailing ship was shelled and sunk in the Mediterranean Sea off Haifa, Palestine (32°32′N 34°30′E) by U-81 (Kriegsmarine). Her eight crew survived.
Fort Mumford	United Kingdom	World War II: The Fort ship was torpedoed and sunk in the Indian Ocean 400 nautical miles (740 km; 460 mi) north west of Ceylon (10°00′N 71°00′E) by I-27 (Imperial Japanese Navy). Her crew survived the sinking, but all but one gunner were machine gunned and killed in their lifeboats. The gunner was rescued by an Arab dhow.
Mariso	Netherlands	World War II: The cargo ship was torpedoed and sunk in the Atlantic Ocean 90 nautical miles (170 km; 100 mi) off Bahia, Brazil (13°20′S 37°25′W) by U-518 (Kriegsmarine) with the loss of two of her 111 crew. Two of the survivors were taken aboard U-518 as prisoners of war.
Mawahab Allah	Syria	World War II: The sailing ship was shelled and sunk in the Mediterranean Sea off Haifa (34°30′N 34°32′E) by U-81 (Kriegsmarine).
Nortun	Panama	World War II: Convoy CN 13: The cargo ship was torpedoed and sunk in the Indian Ocean (27°35′S 14°22′E) by U-516 (Kriegsmarine) with the loss of ten of her 47 crew.
Shinsei Maru	Imperial Japanese Navy	World War II: The patrol boat was sunk by shellfire in the East China Sea by USS Sawfish (United States Navy).
YP-438	United States Navy	The yard patrol craft struck a submerged breakwater and sank at the entrance to Port Everglades, Florida.

== 21 March ==
List of shipwrecks: 21 March 1943
Ship	State	Description
City of Christchurch	United Kingdom	World War II: Convoy KMS 11: The cargo ship was bombed and damaged in the Atlantic Ocean off the coast of Portugal (39°35′N 12°46′W) by a Focke-Wulf Fw 200 aircraft of I Staffeln, Kampfgeschwader 40, Luftwaffe. She sank the next day (38°42′N 10°14′W).
Giorgio	Italy	World War II: The tanker was torpedoed and damaged in the Mediterranean Sea (38°05′N 14°10′E) by HMS Splendid (Royal Navy). She was taken in tow, but consequently sank.
Hozan Maru	Japan	World War II: The cargo ship was torpedoed and sunk in the Yellow Sea off the coast of Korea (38°11′N 124°33′E) by USS Wahoo (United States Navy). Thirty-seven of her crew were killed.
I-O-21	Luftwaffe	World War II: The Siebelgefäß landing craft was sunk by air attack in the Mediterranean Sea between Marsala, Sicily, Italy and Tunis, Tunisia.
MZ 786	Regia Marina	World War II: The landing craft sank north of Cape Bon, Tunisia (37°33′N 10°54′E) after an explosion, cause unknown. Thirteen of her crew were killed. Two of her crew and all four passengers were rescued.
Nittsu Maru	Japan	World War II: The cargo ship was torpedoed and sunk in the Yellow Sea off Korea (38°05′N 124°33′E) by USS Wahoo (United States Navy) with the loss of twenty of her crew.
Svend Foyn	United Kingdom	World War II: Convoy HX 229A: The whale factory ship, which had collided with an iceberg 70 nautical miles (130 km) south of Cape Farewell, Greenland (58°05′N 44°15′W) on 19 March, foundered with the loss of 43 out of the 195 crew and passengers aboard.

== 22 March ==
List of shipwrecks: 22 March 1943
Ship	State	Description
Alessandro Volta	Italy	World War II: The cargo ship was hit by bombs during an attack on Palermo, Sicily, by Consolidated B-24 Liberator aircraft of 301st Bombardment Group, United States Army Air Force. She was loaded with ammunition and exploded, devastating the port and sinking several other ships.
Eurosee	Germany	World War II: The tanker was sunk at Wilhelmshaven in an American air raid.
Franco M	Italy	World War II: The cargo ship was sunk during an attack on Palermo by Consolidated B-24 Liberator aircraft of 301st Bombardment Group, United States Army Air Force, either by bombs or by the explosion of the ammunition ship Alessandro Volta (Italy).
Hermann von Salza	Kriegsmarine	World War II: The tanker was damaged in an Allied air raid on Saint-Nazaire, Loire-Inférieure, France. She was repaired and returned to service.
HMML 1157	Royal Navy	World War II: The harbour defence motor launch was lost as cargo when City of Christchurch (United Kingdom), bombed by a Focke-Wulf Fw 200 aircraft of the Luftwaffe the day before, sank in the Atlantic Ocean off the coast Portugal.
HMML 1212	Royal Navy	World War II: The harbour defence motor launch was lost as cargo when City of Christchurch (United Kingdom), bombed by a Focke-Wulf Fw 200 aircraft of the Luftwaffe the day before, sank in the Atlantic Ocean off the coast of Portugal.
Labor	Italy	World War II: The tanker was sunk during an attack on Palermo by Consolidated B-24 Liberator aircraft of 301st Bombardment Group, United States Army Air Force, either by bombs or by the explosion of the ammunition ship Alessandro Volta (Italy).
Lentini	Italy	World War II: The cargo ship was sunk during an attack on Palermo by Consolidated B-24 Liberator aircraft of 301st Bombardment Group, United States Army Air Force, either by bombs or by the explosion of the ammunition ship Alessandro Volta (Italy).
Manzoni	Italy	World War II: The cargo ship was torpedoed and sunk in the Mediterranean Sea by a Vickers Wellington aircraft of 221 Squadron, Royal Air Force off Capri. There were six dead and 119 survivors. Also reported as being torpedoed and sunk by British aircraft at Tripoli, Libya, with the wreck being refloated and scrapped.
Maria Louisa	Italy	World War II: The motor sailboat/transport was captured by a Partizan boat and sunk. She was later raised and converted into a hospital boat.
Meigen Maru	Imperial Japanese Army	World War II: The Yoshida Maru No. 1-class auxiliary transport was torpedoed and sunk 30 miles (48 km) north of Soerabaya, Java, Netherlands East Indies (06°31′S 112°47′E) by USS Gudgeon (United States Navy). Eight of her crew were killed.
Modena	Italy	World War II: The cargo ship was sunk during an attack on Palermo by Consolidated B-24 Liberator aircraft of 301st Bombardment Group, United States Army Air Force, either by bombs or by the explosion of the ammunition ship Alessandro Volta (Italy). She was refloated on 15 January 1945 and scrapped in 1948.
Mondovi	Italy	World War II: The cargo ship was sunk during an attack on Palermo by Consolidated B-24 Liberator aircraft of 301st Bombardment Group, United States Army Air Force, either by bombs or by the explosion of the ammunition ship Alessandro Volta (Italy).
Monti	Italy	World War II: The cargo ship was bombed and sunk in the Mediterranean Sea east of Bizerta, Tunisia by Allied aircraft. There were 41 dead and 102 survivors.
Renato	Italy	World War II: The motor sailboat/transport was captured by a Partizan boat and sunk.
Rosa	Italy	World War II: The cargo ship was sunk during an attack on Palermo by Consolidated B-24 Liberator aircraft of 301st Bombardment Group, United States Army Air Force, either by bombs or by the explosion of the ammunition ship Alessandro Volta (Italy).
Toni II	Germany	World War II: The cargo ship was torpedoed and damaged in the Mediterranean Sea (39°14′N 15°59′E) by HMS Tribune (Royal Navy). She was towed in to Naples, Italy and laid up.
Trentino	Italy	World War II: The cargo ship was sunk during an attack on Palermo by Consolidated B-24 Liberator aircraft of 301st Bombardment Group, United States Army Air Force, either by bombs or by the explosion of the ammunition ship Alessandro Volta (Italy).
U-524	Kriegsmarine	World War II: The Type IXC submarine was depth charged and sunk in the Atlantic Ocean south of Madeira, Portugal (30°15′N 18°13′W) by a Consolidated B-24 Liberator aircraft of the United States Army Air Force with the loss of all 52 crew.
U-665	Kriegsmarine	World War II: The Type VIIC submarine went missing with all 46 hands in the Bay of Biscay while returning from patrol.

== 23 March ==
List of shipwrecks: 23 March 1943
Ship	State	Description
Bergholm	Norway	World War II: Shetland Bus: The fishing vessel was attacked on 22 March by German aircraft about 75 nautical miles (139 km; 86 mi) from the Norwegian coast while returning from a mission to Norway and was severely damaged. Her eight crew, five of them wounded, abandoned her. One of them died of his wounds, but the others reached the coast, found help and were rescued by a motor torpedo boat three weeks later. Two German minesweepers sent to capture Bergholm found her empty and she sank while an attempt was made to salvage her.
Delfino	Regia Marina	The Squalo-class submarine sank after a collision with a pilot boat off Augusta, Sicily with the loss of 28 of her crew.
Katyosan Maru	Japan	World War II: The collier was torpedoed and sunk in the Laotiehshan Channel by USS Wahoo (United States Navy).
Kenyo Maru	Imperial Japanese Navy	World War II: The Kenyo Maru-class auxiliary transport was torpedoed and sunk 122 nautical miles (226 km; 140 mi) north north west of Saipan, Mariana Islands (17°16′N 144°56′E) by USS Whale (United States Navy). One hundred and thirty engineering passengers, 30 comfort women, and four of her crew were killed.
Windsor Castle	United Kingdom	World War II: Convoy KMF 11: The troopship was torpedoed and sunk in the Mediterranean Sea 110 nautical miles (200 km; 130 mi) west north west of Algiers, Algeria (37°27′N 0°54′E) by a Heinkel He 111 aircraft of II Staffeln, Kampfgeschwader 26, Luftwaffe with the loss of one of the 2,989 people on board. Survivors were rescued by HMS Whaddon, HMS Eggesford, and HMS Douglas (all Royal Navy).
YC-869	United States Navy	The unpowered open lighter ran aground and sank off Imperial Beach, California.
Zeila	Italy	World War II: The cargo ship was torpedoed and sunk in the Mediterranean Sea off Cape Spartivento, Sardinia, Italy (37°57′N 16°10′E) by Unison (Royal Navy). Ten of her 24 crew were killed.

== 24 March ==
List of shipwrecks: 24 March 1943
Ship	State	Description
Ascari	Regia Marina	World War II: The Soldati-class destroyer struck a mine and sank in the Mediterranean Sea. Four hundred and seventy-four men died (194 crew and 280 carried German troops). There were 59 survivors (53 crew and 6 Germans).
Bungsberg	Germany	World War II: The cargo ship struck a mine laid by a Soviet aircraft and sank in Tallinn Bay.
Lanzerotto Malocello	Regia Marina	World War II: The Navigatori-class destroyer struck a mine and sank north of Cape Bon, Tunisia. Five hundred and twenty men died (199 crew and 321 embarked German troops). There were 80 survivors (42 crew and 38 Germans).
RD 56	Regia Marina	World War II: The RD-class minesweeper had been sunk at Bizerta, Tunisia on 9 January 1943. She had been raised and brought to dry dock in the Arsenal of Sidi Abdallah, also in Bizerte. She was again bombed and sunk there.
SF 189	Luftwaffe	World War II: The Siebel ferry was bombed and sunk at Bizerta.
Takaosan Maru	Japan	World War II: The tanker was torpedoed and sunk in the Laotiehshan Channel by USS Wahoo (United States Navy) with the loss of 36 lives.
Tosca	Italy	World War II: The coaster was torpedoed and sunk in the Mediterranean Sea west of Cape Calava, Sicily by HMS Sahib (Royal Navy). Four of her crew were killed.

== 25 March ==
List of shipwrecks: 25 March 1943
Ship	State	Description
Atland	Sweden	World War II: The cargo ship collided with Carso (Sweden) in a convoy and sank off Peterhead, Aberdeenshire, United Kingdom with the loss of nineteen of her crew. Atland was on a voyage from New York, United States to London, United Kingdom.
Industria	Sweden	World War II: The cargo ship (1,688 GRT) was torpedoed and sunk in the Atlantic Ocean off Aracaju, Brazil (11°40′S 35°55′W) by U-518 (Kriegsmarine) with the loss of one of her 26 crew. Three survivors were taken aboard U-518 as prisoners of war. The rest of them were rescued by St. Cergue (Switzerland).
PiLB 256	Kriegsmarine	World War II: The PiBL 40 type landing craft was sunk by an air attack at Bizerta, Tunisia.
Rinoceros	Kriegsmarine	World War II: The Hippopotame-class naval tug was bombed and sunk at Sousse, Tunisia by Allied aircraft.
Satsuki Maru	Japan	World War II: The cargo ship was shelled and sunk in the Laotiehshan Channel by USS Wahoo (United States Navy).
U-469	Kriegsmarine	World War II: The Type VIIC submarine was depth charged and sunk in the Atlantic Ocean south of Iceland (62°12′N 16°40′W by a Boeing B-17 Flying Fortress aircraft on 206 Squadron, Royal Air Force with the loss of all hands (46 or 47 depending on source).
VAS 216	Regia Marina	World War II: The VAS 201-class submarine chaser was sunk at Sfax, Tunisia by Allied aircraft.

== 26 March ==
List of shipwrecks: 26 March 1943
Ship	State	Description
Chervony Kazak	Soviet Union	World War II: The schooner was sunk in the Black Sea near Novorossiysk by Kriegsmarine Schnellboote.
City of Perth	United Kingdom	World War II: Convoy MKS 10: The cargo ship was torpedoed and damaged in the Mediterranean Sea north west of Oran, Algeria (35°50′N 1°41′W) by U-431 (Kriegsmarine) with the loss of two of her 92 crew. She was taken in tow by HMT Man O'War (Royal Navy) and beached south of Cape Figalo, where she was declared a total loss.
Empire Standard	United Kingdom	World War II: The cargo ship was torpedoed and damaged at Algiers, Algeria by Junkers Ju 88 aircraft of II Staffeln, Kampfgeschwader 30, Luftwaffe. Her back broken, she was declared a constructive total loss, towed out to sea and scuttled.
Maceio	Germany	The cargo ship struck the wreck of W. E. Hutton (United States) and sank in the Atlantic Ocean (34°30′N 76°54′W).
Prins Willem III	Netherlands	World War II: Convoy KMF 12: The cargo ship was torpedoed and sunk in the Mediterranean Sea (37°00′N 2°14′E) by Heinkel He 111 aircraft of I Staffeln, Kampfgeschwader 26, Luftwaffe with the loss of eleven lives.
Sergent Gouarne	Free French Naval Forces	World War II: The naval trawler was torpedoed and sunk in the Mediterranean Sea north of Ceuta, Spain (35°55′N 2°59′W) by U-755 (Kriegsmarine) with the loss of 56 of her 70 crew.
T-511	Soviet Navy	World War II: The auxiliary minesweeper was sunk by a mine off Myskhako. She was loaded with wounded and there were more than 300 dead.

== 27 March ==
List of shipwrecks: 27 March 1943
Ship	State	Description
USCGC CG-85006	United States Coast Guard	The patrol boat was sunk off Long Island, New York by an explosion probably caused by a gasoline leak. Only her commanding officer survived out of a crew of ten.
City of Guildford	United Kingdom	World War II: Convoy XT 2: The cargo ship was torpedoed and sunk in the Mediterranean Sea off Derna, Libya (33°00′N 22°50′E) by U-593 (Kriegsmarine) with the loss of 129 of the 142 people aboard. Survivors were rescued by HMS Exmoor (Royal Navy).
HMS Dasher	Royal Navy	The Avenger-class escort carrier sank in the Firth of Clyde after an internal explosion, with the loss of 379 of her 528 crew.
Empire Rowan	United Kingdom	World War II: Convoy KMF 12: The CAM ship was torpedoed and sunk in the Mediterranean Sea (37°16′N 6°54′E) by Savoia-Marchetti S.79 aircraft of 105 Squadriglia, Regia Aeronautica with the loss of three lives.
Lillian Luckenbach	United States	World War II: Convoy ON 48: The cargo ship collided with Cape Henlopen (United States) and sank in the Atlantic Ocean (36°58′N 75°25′W). Her crew survived.
PiLF 241	Kriegsmarine	World War II: The Siebel ferry was bombed and sunk at Palermo, Sicily, Italy.
Sidamo	Italy	World War II: The cargo ship was torpedoed and sunk in the Mediterranean Sea by HMS Sahib (Royal Navy).
Toko Maru	Japan	World War II: The tanker was torpedoed and sunk in the Pacific Ocean by USS Gudgeon (United States Navy).
U-169	Kriegsmarine	World War II: The Type IXC/40 submarine was depth charged and sunk in the Atlantic Ocean south of Iceland (60°54′N 15°25′W) by a Boeing B-17 Flying Fortress aircraft of 206 Squadron, Royal Air Force with the loss of all 54 crew.

== 28 March ==
List of shipwrecks: 28 March 1943
Ship	State	Description
Archangelos	Greece	World War II: The cargo ship was torpedoed and sunk in the Aegean Sea by HMS Parthian (Royal Navy).
Bantam	Netherlands	World War II: The cargo ship was attacked by Japanese aircraft and was beached in Oro Bay. Her 72 crew survived. She was subsequently refloated and towed to Sydney, New South Wales, Australia.
Caterina Costa	Italy	World War II: The cargo ship, loaded with explosives and gasoline, caught fire while moored at Naples and was destroyed by a huge explosion that devastated the harbor, killing more than 600 people and injuring another 3,000.
Ceuta	Germany	World War II: The cargo ship was bombed and sunk at Rotterdam, South Holland, Netherlands, by Royal Air Force aircraft. She was later raised, repaired and returned to service.
Granicos	Greece	World War II: The cargo ship was torpedoed and sunk in the Atlantic Ocean (3°49′N 15°15′W) by Giuseppe Finzi (Regia Marina) with the loss of 32 lives. One survivor was rescued by the submarine and another one week later by an Allied ship.
Lagosian	United Kingdom	World War II: Convoy RS 3: The cargo ship was torpedoed and sunk in the Atlantic Ocean south east of the Canary Islands, Spain (25°41′N 15°43′W) by U-167 (Kriegsmarine) with the loss of eleven of her 46 crew. Survivors were rescued by Empire Denis (United Kingdom).
Lillois	France	World War II: The cargo ship was torpedoed and sunk in the Mediterranean Sea off Cape Scalea, Italy by HMS Torbay (Royal Navy).
Masaya	United States Army	World War II: The cargo ship was bombed and sunk in the Pacific Ocean east of New Guinea by Japanese aircraft.
Moanda	Belgium	World War II: Convoy RS 3: The cargo ship was torpedoed and sunk in the Atlantic Ocean off Río de Oro, Spanish Sahara (24°44′N 16°48′W) by U-172 (Kriegsmarine) with the loss of 29 out of her 56 crew.
Rousdi	Egypt	World War II: The coaster was torpedoed and sunk in the Mediterranean Sea (31°36′N 34°23′E) by U-81 (Kriegsmarine) with the loss of nine of her ten crew.
Silverbeech	United Kingdom	World War II: Convoy RS 3: The cargo ship was torpedoed and sunk southeast of the Canary Islands (25°20′N 15°55′W) by U-159 (Kriegsmarine) with the loss of 62 of her 69 crew.
Suwa Maru	Imperial Japanese Navy	Suwa Maru World War II: The Suwa Maru-class auxiliary transport ship was torpedoed ten nautical miles (19 km; 12 mi) off Wake Island, Marshall Islands by USS Tunny (United States Navy) and was beached on a reef to avoid sinking. She was abandoned (19°13′N 166°34′E). Fifteen passengers were killed. The wreck was again torpedoed on 5 April by USS Finback (United States Navy).
U-77	Kriegsmarine	World War II: The Type VIIC submarine was depth charged and damaged in the Atlantic Ocean south of Cape Nao, Spain (37°42′N 0°10′E) by Lockheed Hudson aircraft of 48 and 233 Squadrons, Royal Air Force. She sank the next day with the loss of 38 of her 47 crew.
V 2018 Vogtland	Kriegsmarine	World War II: The Vorpostenboot struck a mine in the North Sea and was damaged. She was taken in tow by V 801 Max Gundelach (Kriegsmarine) but struck another mine the next day and sank with the loss of four of her crew.

== 29 March ==
List of shipwrecks: 29 March 1943
Ship	State	Description
Ajax	Germany	World War II: The cargo ship was torpedoed and sunk off Kongsfjord (70°49′N 29°30′E) by S-55 (Soviet Navy). Two of her crew were killed.
Angela Mitylene	Greece	World War II: The coaster was torpedoed and sunk in the Aegean Sea by HMS Parthian (Royal Navy).
UJ 2201 Bois Rose	Kriegsmarine	World War II: The auxiliary submarine chaser was torpedoed and sunk in the Bay of Palermo (38°06′N 13°26′E) by HMS Unrivalled (Royal Navy). Five of her crew were killed.
UJ 2204 Boréal	Kriegsmarine	World War II: The auxiliary submarine chaser was torpedoed and sunk in the Bay of Palermo (38°06′N 13°26′E) by HMS Unrivalled (Royal Navy). Three of her crew were killed.
Celtic Star	United Kingdom	World War II: The cargo ship was torpedoed and sunk in the Atlantic Ocean (4°16′N 17°44′W) by Giuseppe Finza (Regia Marina) with the loss of two of her 68 crew. One of the survivors was taken as a prisoner or war.
Esso Manhattan	United States	The T2 tanker broke in two off New York. She was subsequently repaired and returned to service.
Egle	Italy	World War II: The cargo ship was torpedoed and sunk in the Mediterranean Sea off the coast of Sicily by HNLMS Dolfijn (Royal Netherlands Navy).
Empire Whale	United Kingdom	World War II: Convoy SL 126: The Design 1037 ship was torpedoed and sunk in the Atlantic Ocean (46°44′N 16°38′W) by U-662 (Kriegsmarine) with the loss of 47 of the 57 people aboard. Survivors were rescued by HMS Spey (Royal Navy).
Nagara	United Kingdom	World War II: Convoy SL 126: The cargo ship was torpedoed and damaged in the Atlantic Ocean 425 nautical miles (787 km; 489 mi) north west of Cape Finisterre, Spain (46°50′N 16°40′W) by U-404 (Kriegsmarine). She was taken in tow by HMS Dexterous (Royal Navy) but foundered on 4 April at 47°52′N 14°03′W). Her 97 crew were rescued by HMS Wear (Royal Navy).
R-30	Kriegsmarine	World War II: The Type R-25 minesweeper was sunk by Soviet aircraft off Kerch, Soviet Union.
S 29	Kriegsmarine	World War II: The E-boat sank after a battle with HMMGB 321 and HMMGB 333 (both Royal Navy). Four of her crew were killed.
Tōhō Maru	Imperial Japanese Navy	World War II: The tanker was torpedoed and sunk in the Makassar Strait between Tarakan and Samarinda, Borneo (00°30′N 118°26′E) by USS Gudgeon (United States Navy).
Umaria	United Kingdom	World War II: Convoy SL 126: The cargo ship was torpedoed and damaged in the Atlantic Ocean (46°44′N 16°38′W) by U-662 (Kriegsmarine). All 103 people aboard were rescued by HMS Wear (Royal Navy), which scuttled the ship.
William Pierce Frye	United States	World War II: Convoy HX 230: The Liberty ship straggled behind the convoy. She was torpedoed and sunk in the Atlantic Ocean (56°56′N 24°15′W) by U-610 (Kriegsmarine) with the loss of 57 of her 64 crew. Survivors were rescued by HMS Shikari (Royal Navy).
Yamabato Maru	Japan	World War II: The cargo ship was torpedoed and sunk in the Yellow Sea by USS Wahoo (United States Navy).

== 30 March ==
List of shipwrecks: 30 March 1943
Ship	State	Description
Brattholm	Norway	World War II: The fishing boat was scuttled by her crew after being intercepted by a Kriegsmarine warship during a Shetland bus mission to occupied Norway. Of the twelve people on board, one was killed and two were mortally wounded, while eight were captured and executed by the Germans. The final person on Brattholm, Jan Baalsrud, escaped to neutral Sweden.
Empire Bowman	United Kingdom	World War II: Convoy SL 126: The cargo ship was torpedoed and sunk in the Atlantic Ocean 425 nautical miles (787 km) west of Cape Finisterre, Spain (47°26′N 15°53′W) by U-404 (Kriegsmarine) with the loss of four of her 50 crew. Survivors were rescued by HMS Wear (Royal Navy).
Fort a la Corne	United Kingdom	World War II: Convoy ET 16: The Fort ship was torpedoed and sunk in the Mediterranean Sea (36°52′N 1°47′E) by U-596 (Kriegsmarine). Her 54 crew were rescued by the convoy's escorts.
RFA Hallanger	Royal Fleet Auxiliary	World War II: Convoy ET 16: The tanker was torpedoed and sunk in the Mediterranean Sea (36°55′N 1°39′E) by U-596 (Kriegsmarine). Her 44 crew survived.
Kurohime Maru	Imperial Japanese Army	World War II: The Kurohime Maru-class auxiliary transport was torpedoed and sunk in the Pacific Ocean north east of Manus Island, Bismarck Archipelago (00°35′N 147°55′E) by USS Tuna (United States Navy). Twenty-seven passengers and nine of her crew were killed.
Regensburg	Germany	World War II: The cargo ship was intercepted in the Atlantic Ocean between Greenland and Iceland by HMS Glasgow (Royal Navy) and was scuttled by her crew. Only six of her 118 crew were rescued by HMS Glasgow.
Santa Maria Del Salvazione, and San Vincenzo	Italy	World War II: The sailing vessels were sunk in the Mediterranean Sea between Reggio Calabria and Milazzo, Sicily by gunfire from HMS Sahib (Royal Navy). Two other vesselss were damaged. In all, one person was killed and six were wounded.

== 31 March ==
List of shipwrecks: 31 March 1943
Ship	State	Description
HMT Caulonia	Royal Navy	The naval trawler ran aground and foundered off Rye Bay, Sussex. Three of her 24 crew members were lost, and eleven were slightly wounded.
Charles Le Borgne	Kriegsmarine	The cargo ship (1,426 GRT) ran aground in the evening at Ras Ahmer, west of Cape Bon and was wrecked.
Lubiana	Regia Marina	The Beograd-class destroyer (1,210 GRT) ran aground in the evening at Ras Ahmer, west of Cape Bon and was wrecked. Her crew were rescued.
MAS 530, and MAS 532	Regia Marina	World War II: The MAS 526-class MAS boats were sunk at Cagliari by British aircraft.
MAS 560, and MAS 563	Regia Marina	World War II: The MAS 552-class MAS boats were sunk at Cagliari by British aircraft.
Nanshin Maru	Japan	The cargo ship ran aground and was wrecked in the Inland Sea of Japan off Itozaki (08°28′N 134°06′E).
Nanshin Maru	Japan	The cargo ship was sunk in a collision with Oha Maru (Japan) 119 nautical miles (220 km) south south west of Itozaki (33°51′N 130°15′E).
Nuoro	Italy	World War II: The cargo ship was bombed or torpedoed and sunk in the Mediterranean Sea off Cape Bon, Tunisia by Allied aircraft. There were 21 or 23 dead and 92 or 94 survivors.
T. C. McCobb	United States	World War II: The tanker was torpedoed and damaged in the Atlantic Ocean (7°10′N 45°20′W) by Pietro Calvi (Regia Marina) with the loss of 24 of her 39 crew. She sank the next day.
Tilsit	Germany	World War II: The cargo ship struck a mine and sank off Southern Norway.

== Unknown date ==
List of shipwrecks: Unknown date 1943
Ship	State	Description
K-3	Soviet Navy	World War II: Most sources say the K-class submarine was sunk on 21 March with depth charges by UJ-1102, UJ-1106, and UJ-1111 (all Kriegsmarine) off Båtsfjord, Norway (71°12′N 27°41′E), but she may have been sunk in another attack on 28 March or in a minefield. She was lost with all 68 hands.
HMS LCP(L) 276	Royal Navy	The landing craft personnel (large) was lost sometime in March.
HMS LCP(L) 277	Royal Navy	The landing craft personnel (large) was lost "in transit".
HMS LCS(M) 23	Royal Navy	The landing craft support (mortar) was lost in the Mayu River, Burma sometime in March.
Sirène	Regia Marina	World War II: A day after she was refloated at Toulon, Var, France, the Sirène-class submarine sank again at Toulon on either 22 or 24 March.
HMS Thunderbolt	Royal Navy	World War II: The T-class submarine was depth charged and sunk in the Mediterranean Sea off Sicily, Italy either by Cicogna (Regia Marina) on 12 March, or by Libra (Regia Marina) on 14 March, with the loss of all 62 crew.
HMS Turbulent	Royal Navy	World War II: The T-class submarine was sunk in the Mediterranean Sea off Corsica, France with the loss of all 67 crew.

== Notes ==
^[Note 1] Task Force 68 comprised USS Cleveland, USS Conway, USS Cony, USS Denver, USS Montpelier and USS Waller.
