= German submarine U-338 =

German World War II submarine

History

Nazi Germany
- Name: U-338
- Ordered: 21 November 1940
- Builder: Nordseewerke, Emden
- Yard number: 210
- Laid down: 4 April 1941
- Launched: 20 April 1942
- Commissioned: 25 June 1942
- Nickname(s): Wildesel ("Wild Donkey")
- Fate: Sunk on 20 September 1943

General characteristics
- Class & type: Type VIIC submarine
- Displacement: 769 tonnes (757 long tons) surfaced; 871 t (857 long tons) submerged
- Length: 67.10 m (220 ft 2 in) o/a; 50.50 m (165 ft 8 in) pressure hull
- Beam: 6.20 m (20 ft 4 in) o/a; 4.70 m (15 ft 5 in) pressure hull
- Height: 9.60 m (31 ft 6 in)
- Draught: 4.74 m (15 ft 7 in)
- Installed power: 2,800–3,200 PS (2,100–2,400 kW; 2,800–3,200 bhp) (diesels); 750 PS (550 kW; 740 shp) (electric)
- Propulsion: 2 shafts; 2 × diesel engines; 2 × electric motors
- Speed: 17.7 knots (32.8 km/h; 20.4 mph) surfaced; 7.6 knots (14.1 km/h; 8.7 mph) submerged
- Range: 8,500 nmi (15,700 km; 9,800 mi) at 10 knots (19 km/h; 12 mph) surfaced; 80 nmi (150 km; 92 mi) at 4 knots (7.4 km/h; 4.6 mph) submerged
- Test depth: 230 m (750 ft); Crush depth: 250–295 m (820–968 ft)
- Complement: 4 officers, 40–56 enlisted
- Armament: 5 × 53.3 cm (21 in) torpedo tubes (four bow, one stern); 14 × torpedoes or 26 TMA mines; 1 × 8.8 cm (3.46 in) deck gun (220 rounds); 1 x 2 cm (0.79 in) C/30 AA gun

Service record
- Part of: 8th U-boat Flotilla; 25 June 1942 – 28 February 1943; 7th U-boat Flotilla; 1 March – 20 September 1943
- Identification codes: M 06 256
- Commanders: Kptlt. Manfred Kinzel; 25 June 1942 – 20 September 1943
- Operations: 3 patrols: 1st patrol: 23 February – 24 March 1943; 2nd patrol: 15 – 21 June 1943; 3rd patrol: 25 August – 20 September 1943
- Victories: 4 merchant ships sunk (21,927 GRT); 1 merchant ship damaged (7,134 GRT); 1 Halifax bomber shot down

German submarine U-338 was a Type VIIC U-boat of Nazi Germany's Kriegsmarine during World War II. The submarine was laid down on 4 April 1941 at the Nordseewerke yard at Emden, launched on 20 April 1942, and commissioned on 25 June 1942 under the command of Oberleutnant zur See Manfred Kinzel.

== Design ==
German Type VIIC submarines were preceded by the shorter Type VIIB submarines. U-338 had a displacement of 769 tonnes (757 long tons) when at the surface and 871 tonnes (857 long tons) while submerged. She had a total length of 67.10 m (220 ft 2 in), a pressure hull length of 50.50 m (165 ft 8 in), a beam of 6.20 m (20 ft 4 in), a height of 9.60 m (31 ft 6 in), and a draught of 4.74 m (15 ft 7 in). The submarine was powered by two Germaniawerft F46 four-stroke, six-cylinder supercharged diesel engines producing a total of 2,800 to 3,200 metric horsepower (2,060 to 2,350 kW; 2,760 to 3,160 shp) for use while surfaced, two AEG GU 460/8–27 double-acting electric motors producing a total of 750 metric horsepower (550 kW; 740 shp) for use while submerged. She had two shafts and two 1.23 m (4 ft) propellers. The boat was capable of operating at depths of up to 230 metres (750 ft).

The submarine had a maximum surface speed of 17.7 knots (32.8 km/h; 20.4 mph) and a maximum submerged speed of 7.6 knots (14.1 km/h; 8.7 mph). When submerged, the boat could operate for 80 nautical miles (150 km; 92 mi) at 4 knots (7.4 km/h; 4.6 mph); when surfaced, she could travel 8,500 nautical miles (15,700 km; 9,800 mi) at 10 knots (19 km/h; 12 mph). U-338 was fitted with five 53.3 cm (21 in) torpedo tubes (four fitted at the bow and one at the stern), fourteen torpedoes, one 8.8 cm (3.46 in) SK C/35 naval gun, 220 rounds, and a 2 cm (0.79 in) C/30 anti-aircraft gun. The boat had a complement of between forty-four and sixty.

== Service history ==
U-338 was nicknamed Wildesel ("Wild Donkey") after an incident on the day of its launch, when the U-boat broke free from its moorings and struck a small tug boat, sinking it. After training with the 8th U-boat Flotilla at Danzig, U-338 was transferred to the 7th U-boat Flotilla for front-line service on 1 March 1943.

=== First patrol ===
U-338 sailed from Kiel on 23 February 1943 under the command of Kapitänleutnant Manfred Kinzel, and out into the north Atlantic where she joined the wolfpack 'Stürmer' on 11 March for an attack on Convoy SC 122. On 17 March at 03:05, U-338 fired two torpedoes at the convoy southeast of Cape Farewell, Greenland and hit and sank two British merchant ships; the 4,898 GRT Kingsbury, and the 5,072 GRT King Gruffydd. After a minute, two more torpedoes were fired, one of which struck the 7,886 GRT Dutch merchantman Alderamin, which later sank. A single torpedo was then fired from the stern tube aimed at the Alderamin, but it missed and struck the 7,134 GRT British merchant ship Fort Cedar Lake. The ship, badly damaged, fell behind the convoy and was sunk by U-665 around noon. U-338 attacked the convoy again at 14:52 with another salvo of torpedoes, one of which hit the 4,071 GRT Panama-registered American ship Granville, which broke in two amidships and sank within 15 minutes.

On 22 March 1943, U-338 was in the Bay of Biscay, heading for its new home port of Saint-Nazaire in France, when it was attacked by a British Halifax bomber from No. 502 Squadron RAF. Anti-aircraft fire from the submarine hit the starboard outer engine and fuselage of the aircraft, causing its bombs to fall wide and cause only slight damage to the U-boat. The aircraft was seen to crash into the sea some distance away, killing all but one of the eight-man crew, who was picked up by U-338 and taken prisoner. Two days later, on 24 March, the U-boat arrived at St. Nazaire.

=== Second patrol ===
U-338 sailed from St. Nazaire on 15 June 1943, but the patrol was cut short when she was attacked on the 17th by a B-17 Flying Fortress from No. 206 Squadron RAF. The U-boat was damaged, the Obersteuermann ("Navigator") killed, and three men were wounded. The U-boat returned to port on 21 June.

=== Third patrol and loss ===
U-338 sailed from St. Nazaire again on 25 August 1943 into the mid-Atlantic, joining the wolfpack 'Leuthen' on 15 September. The U-boat was lost on 20 September during an attack on Convoy ON 202. After being spotted by a B-24 Liberator patrol aircraft, the Canadian corvette HMCS Drumheller approached at speed firing her 4-inch gun. The U-boat dived, and was located by Drumheller's ASDIC (sonar). As the corvette prepared to attack with depth charges she observed a large underwater explosion. No further contact with U-338 was made, and it is assumed that she was destroyed as a result of damage caused by Drumheller's shell fire.

=== Previously recorded fate ===
U-338 was originally thought to have been sunk on 20 September 1943 southwest of Iceland at position 57°40′N 29°48′W by a homing torpedo from a British B-24 Liberator of Squadron 120/F. This attack was actually against U-386, inflicting no damage.

== Summary of raiding history ==
Date	Ship Name	Nationality	Tonnage (GRT)	Fate
17 March 1943	Alderamin	Netherlands	7,886	Sunk
17 March 1943	Fort Cedar Lake	United Kingdom	7,134	Damaged
17 March 1943	Granville	Panama	4,071	Sunk
17 March 1943	King Gruffydd	United Kingdom	5,072	Sunk
17 March 1943	Kingsbury	United Kingdom	4,898	Sunk

== Bibliography ==
- Busch, Rainer; Röll, Hans-Joachim (1999). German U-boat commanders of World War II : a biographical dictionary. Translated by Brooks, Geoffrey. London, Annapolis, Md: Greenhill Books, Naval Institute Press. ISBN 1-55750-186-6.
- Busch, Rainer; Röll, Hans-Joachim (1999). Der U-Boot-Krieg, 1939-1945: Deutsche U-Boot-Verluste von September 1939 bis Mai 1945 [German U-boat losses from September 1939 to May 1945] (in German). Vol. IV. Hamburg, Berlin, Bonn: Mittler. ISBN 3-8132-0514-2.
- Gröner, Erich; Jung, Dieter; Maass, Martin (1991). U-boats and Mine Warfare Vessels. German Warships 1815–1945. Vol. 2. Translated by Thomas, Keith; Magowan, Rachel. London: Conway Maritime Press. ISBN 0-85177-593-4.
- Kemp, Paul (1999). U-Boats Destroyed - German Submarine Losses in the World Wars. London: Arms & Armour. ISBN 1-85409-515-3.
