= German submarine U-663 =

German World War II submarine

History

Nazi Germany
- Name: U-663
- Ordered: 15 August 1940
- Builder: Deutsche Werft, Hamburg
- Yard number: 812
- Laid down: 31 March 1941
- Launched: 26 March 1942
- Commissioned: 14 May 1942
- Fate: Sunk on 8 May 1943 in the Bay of Biscay in position 46°50′N 10°00′W, by depth charges from a RAAF Sunderland.

General characteristics
- Class & type: Type VIIC submarine
- Displacement: 769 tonnes (757 long tons) surfaced; 871 t (857 long tons) submerged
- Length: 67.10 m (220 ft 2 in) o/a; 50.50 m (165 ft 8 in) pressure hull
- Beam: 6.20 m (20 ft 4 in) o/a; 4.70 m (15 ft 5 in) pressure hull
- Draught: 4.74 m (15 ft 7 in)
- Installed power: 2,800–3,200 PS (2,100–2,400 kW; 2,800–3,200 bhp) (diesels); 750 PS (550 kW; 740 shp) (electric)
- Propulsion: 2 shafts; 2 × diesel engines; 2 × electric motors
- Speed: 17.7 knots (32.8 km/h; 20.4 mph) surfaced; 7.6 knots (14.1 km/h; 8.7 mph) submerged
- Range: 8,500 nmi (15,700 km; 9,800 mi) at 10 knots (19 km/h; 12 mph) surfaced; 80 nmi (150 km; 92 mi) at 4 knots (7.4 km/h; 4.6 mph) submerged
- Test depth: 230 m (750 ft); Crush depth: 250–295 m (820–968 ft)
- Complement: 4 officers, 40–56 enlisted
- Armament: 5 × 53.3 cm (21 in) torpedo tubes (four bow, one stern); 14 × torpedoes; 1 × 8.8 cm (3.46 in) deck gun (220 rounds); 1 x 2 cm (0.79 in) C/30 AA gun

Service record
- Part of: 5th U-boat Flotilla; 14 May – 30 September 1942; 11th U-boat Flotilla; 1 – 31 October 1942; 9th U-boat Flotilla; 1 November 1942 – 8 May 1943
- Identification codes: M 45 175
- Commanders: Kptlt. / K.Kapt. Heinrich Schmid; 14 May 1942 – 8 May 1943
- Operations: 3 patrols: 1st patrol: 5 November – 31 December 1942; 2nd patrol: a. 4 – 6 March 1943; b. 10 March – 4 April 1943; 3rd patrol: 5 – 8 May 1943
- Victories: 2 merchant ships sunk (10,924 GRT)

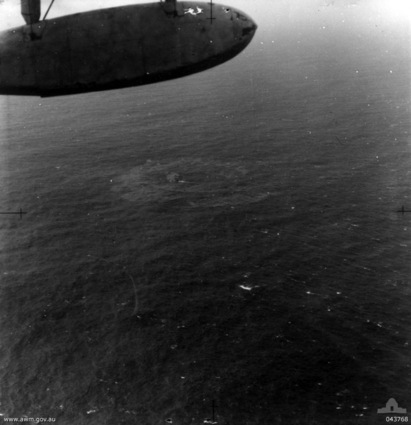
U-663 circling to the right after a second air attack on May 7, 1943

German submarine U-663 was a Type VIIC U-boat built for Nazi Germany's Kriegsmarine for service during World War II. She was laid down on 31 March 1941 by Deutsche Werft, Hamburg as yard number 812, launched on 26 March 1942 and commissioned on 14 May 1942 under Kapitänleutnant Heinrich Schmid.

== Design ==
German Type VIIC submarines were preceded by the shorter Type VIIB submarines. U-663 had a displacement of 769 tonnes (757 long tons) when at the surface and 871 tonnes (857 long tons) while submerged. She had a total length of 67.10 m (220 ft 2 in), a pressure hull length of 50.50 m (165 ft 8 in), a beam of 6.20 m (20 ft 4 in), a height of 9.60 m (31 ft 6 in), and a draught of 4.74 m (15 ft 7 in). The submarine was powered by two Germaniawerft F46 four-stroke, six-cylinder supercharged diesel engines producing a total of 2,800 to 3,200 metric horsepower (2,060 to 2,350 kW; 2,760 to 3,160 shp) for use while surfaced, two Siemens-Schuckert GU 343/38–8 double-acting electric motors producing a total of 750 metric horsepower (550 kW; 740 shp) for use while submerged. She had two shafts and two 1.23 m (4 ft) propellers. The boat was capable of operating at depths of up to 230 metres (750 ft).

The submarine had a maximum surface speed of 17.7 knots (32.8 km/h; 20.4 mph) and a maximum submerged speed of 7.6 knots (14.1 km/h; 8.7 mph). When submerged, the boat could operate for 80 nautical miles (150 km; 92 mi) at 4 knots (7.4 km/h; 4.6 mph); when surfaced, she could travel 8,500 nautical miles (15,700 km; 9,800 mi) at 10 knots (19 km/h; 12 mph). U-663 was fitted with five 53.3 cm (21 in) torpedo tubes (four fitted at the bow and one at the stern), fourteen torpedoes, one 8.8 cm (3.46 in) SK C/35 naval gun, 220 rounds, and a 2 cm (0.79 in) C/30 anti-aircraft gun. The boat had a complement of between forty-four and sixty.

== Service history ==
The boat's career began with training at 5th U-boat Flotilla on 14 May 1942, followed by active service on 1 October 1942 as part of the 11th Flotilla. After only one month, she transferred to the 9th Flotilla on 1 November 1942, for the remainder of her service.

In 3 patrols she sank 2 merchant ships, for a total of 10,924 gross register tons (GRT).

=== Wolfpacks ===
U-663 took part in four wolfpacks, namely:

- Drachen (22 November – 3 December 1942)
- Panzer (3 – 9 December 1942)
- Büffel (9 – 14 December 1942)
- Seeteufel (21 – 30 March 1943)

=== Fate ===
U-663 was sunk on 8 May 1943 in the Bay of Biscay in position 46°50′N 10°00′W, by depth charges from a No. 10 Squadron RAAF Sunderland. All hands were lost.

== Summary of raiding history ==
Date	Ship Name	Nationality	Tonnage (GRT)	Fate
26 November 1942	Barberrys	United Kingdom	5,170	Sunk
18 March 1943	Clarissa Radcliffe	United Kingdom	5,754	Sunk

== Bibliography ==
- Busch, Rainer; Röll, Hans-Joachim (1999). German U-boat commanders of World War II : a biographical dictionary. Translated by Brooks, Geoffrey. London, Annapolis, Md: Greenhill Books, Naval Institute Press. ISBN 1-55750-186-6.
- Busch, Rainer; Röll, Hans-Joachim (1999). Der U-Boot-Krieg, 1939-1945: Deutsche U-Boot-Verluste von September 1939 bis Mai 1945 [German U-boat losses from September 1939 to May 1945] (in German). Vol. IV. Hamburg, Berlin, Bonn: Mittler. ISBN 3-8132-0514-2.
- Gröner, Eric; Jung, Dieter; Maass, Martin (1991). German Warships 1815-1945: U-boats and Mine Warfare Vessels. Vol. 2. Translated by Thomas, Keith; Magowan, Rachel. London: Conway Maritime Press. ISBN 0-85177-593-4.
- Sharpe, Peter (1998). U-Boat Fact File. Great Britain: Midland Publishing. ISBN 1-85780-072-9.
