= German submarine U-527 =

German World War II submarine

History

Nazi Germany
- Name: U-527
- Ordered: 15 August 1940
- Builder: Deutsche Werft, Hamburg
- Yard number: 342
- Laid down: 28 October 1941
- Launched: 17 June 1942
- Commissioned: 2 September 1942
- Fate: Sunk on 23 July 1943

General characteristics
- Class & type: Type IXC/40 submarine
- Displacement: 1,144 t (1,126 long tons) surfaced; 1,257 t (1,237 long tons) submerged
- Length: 76.76 m (251 ft 10 in) o/a; 58.75 m (192 ft 9 in) pressure hull
- Beam: 6.86 m (22 ft 6 in) o/a 4.44 m (14 ft 7 in) pressure hull
- Height: 9.60 m (31 ft 6 in)
- Draught: 4.67 m (15 ft 4 in)
- Installed power: 4,400 PS (3,200 kW; 4,300 bhp) (diesels); 1,000 PS (740 kW; 990 shp) (electric)
- Propulsion: 2 shafts; 2 × diesel engines; 2 × electric motors
- Speed: 18.3 knots (33.9 km/h; 21.1 mph) surfaced; 7.3 knots (13.5 km/h; 8.4 mph) submerged
- Range: 13,850 nmi (25,650 km; 15,940 mi) at 10 knots (19 km/h; 12 mph) surfaced; 63 nmi (117 km; 72 mi) at 4 knots (7.4 km/h; 4.6 mph) submerged
- Test depth: 230 m (750 ft)
- Complement: 4 officers, 44 enlisted
- Armament: 6 × torpedo tubes (4 bow, 2 stern); 22 × 53.3 cm (21 in) torpedoes; 1 × 10.5 cm (4.1 in) SK C/32 deck gun (180 rounds); 1 × 3.7 cm (1.5 in) SK C/30 AA gun; 1 × twin 2 cm FlaK 30 AA guns

Service record
- Part of: 4th U-boat Flotilla; 2 September – 31 January 1943; 10th U-boat Flotilla; 1 February – 23 July 1943
- Identification codes: M 51 963
- Commanders: Kptlt. Herbert Uhlig; 2 September 1942 – 23 July 1943
- Operations: 2 patrols: 1st patrol: 9 February – 12 April 1943; 2nd patrol: 10 May – 23 July 1943
- Victories: 1 merchant ship sunk (5,242 GRT); 1 warship sunk (291 tons); 1 merchant ship damaged (5,848 GRT)

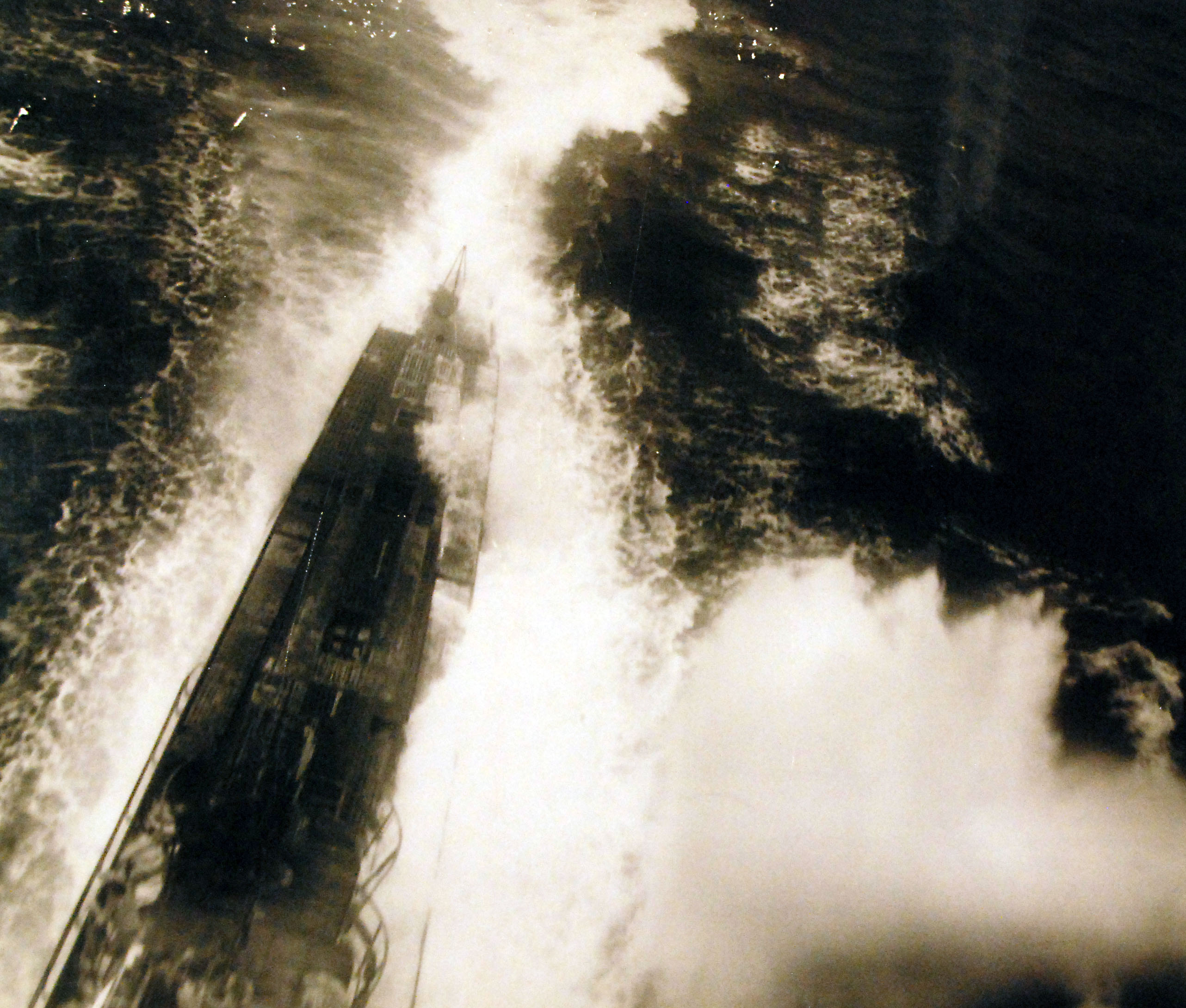
Attack on German submarine, U-527, by TBF-1 aircraft from USS Bogue

German submarine U-527 was a Type IXC U-boat of Nazi Germany's Kriegsmarine during World War II.

She was laid down at the Deutsche Werft yard in Hamburg as yard number 342 on 28 October 1941, launched on 17 June 1942 and commissioned on 2 September with Kapitänleutnant Herbert Uhlig in command.

U-527 began her service career with training as part of the 4th U-boat Flotilla from 2 September 1942. She was reassigned to the 10th flotilla for operations on 1 February 1943.

She carried out two patrols and sank one ship. She also sank one warship and damaged one commercial vessel. She was a member of four wolfpacks.

She was sunk by US aircraft south of the Azores on 23 July 1943.

== Design ==
German Type IXC/40 submarines were slightly larger than the original Type IXCs. U-527 had a displacement of 1,144 tonnes (1,126 long tons) when at the surface and 1,257 tonnes (1,237 long tons) while submerged. The U-boat had a total length of 76.76 m (251 ft 10 in), a pressure hull length of 58.75 m (192 ft 9 in), a beam of 6.86 m (22 ft 6 in), a height of 9.60 m (31 ft 6 in), and a draught of 4.67 m (15 ft 4 in). The submarine was powered by two MAN M 9 V 40/46 supercharged four-stroke, nine-cylinder diesel engines producing a total of 4,400 metric horsepower (3,240 kW; 4,340 shp) for use while surfaced, two Siemens-Schuckert 2 GU 345/34 double-acting electric motors producing a total of 1,000 shaft horsepower (1,010 PS; 750 kW) for use while submerged. She had two shafts and two 1.92 m (6 ft) propellers. The boat was capable of operating at depths of up to 230 metres (750 ft).

The submarine had a maximum surface speed of 18.3 knots (33.9 km/h; 21.1 mph) and a maximum submerged speed of 7.3 knots (13.5 km/h; 8.4 mph). When submerged, the boat could operate for 63 nautical miles (117 km; 72 mi) at 4 knots (7.4 km/h; 4.6 mph); when surfaced, she could travel 13,850 nautical miles (25,650 km; 15,940 mi) at 10 knots (19 km/h; 12 mph). U-527 was fitted with six 53.3 cm (21 in) torpedo tubes (four fitted at the bow and two at the stern), 22 torpedoes, one 10.5 cm (4.13 in) SK C/32 naval gun, 180 rounds, and a 3.7 cm (1.5 in) SK C/30 as well as a 2 cm (0.79 in) C/30 anti-aircraft gun. The boat had a complement of forty-eight.

== Service history ==
=== First patrol ===
The boat departed Kiel on 9 February 1943, moved through the North Sea, negotiated the gap between Iceland and the Faroe Islands and entered the Atlantic Ocean. There, southeast of Cape Farewell (Greenland), she sank Fort Lamy on 8 March. HMS LCT-2480 was also lost.

She damaged Mathew Luckenbach on 19 March. U-523 came across the drifting wreck and finished her off. U-527 was attacked by a Sunderland flying boat on the 20th - damage was slight. She entered Lorient, on the French Atlantic coast, on 12 April 1943.

=== Second patrol and loss ===
Having left Lorient on 10 May 1943, she was in the middle of "attacking a large ship under tow, when a corvette was summoned, which dropped 15 depth charges", damage sustained was minimal. Her sortie continued as far as the Gulf of Mexico.

On the return leg, on 23 July 1943, she was sunk south of the Azores by Avenger aircraft from the carrier USS Bogue. Pilot : Robert L Stearns from Bogue dropped four shallow-set depth charges as U-527 made for cover in a bank of sea fog. The pressure hull aft was blown open, U-527 sank instantly.

Forty men went down with the U-boat; there were 13 survivors. One survivor died in the water of internal injuries. Twelve survivors, sharing four punctured life-vests, were picked up after considerable time in the water; by USS Clemson and then later transferred to USS Bogue. The survivors recall having deafness and contusions which took two weeks to recover from. The survivors were taken to Casablanca and put in the prison there for full interrogation. They were later transported to the USA. The crew had a considerably high regard and respect for their captain, Captain Uhlig, aged 27 years finding him a man of great integrity and fairness. The crew recall that, quite the opposite to the film, 'Das Boot', that they only ever spoke in orderly, quiet voices during service on the seas and that they were neither allowed to shout nor would have done so. On U-527 being hit by the depth charges from the Avenger Aircraft there was only time for the twelve men on watch to escape and one other who was not on watch but around the conning tower. By an act of extreme bravery, Captain Herbert Uhlig, on finding the hatch exit from the conning tower to be damaged and unable to be opened normally, "put his shoulder to the hatch and exerted his utmost force" and the hatch came open. Family of Captain Uhlig remember his having a shoulder injury and weakness for the rest of his life to that shoulder. This act saved the lives of those few of the crew who had time and proximity to escape as U-527 sank almost immediately. Others closer to the blast and damage would have died instantly, the survivors recalled.

The crew were kept together when they arrived in the United States and were put to work in Arizona picking cotton, grapefruit, pineapples and working at the Biltmore Hotel golf course as green keepers. One member of the crew gave away more information than they had been briefed to allow, at Kriegsmarine Schule in their training in Kiel, and he was summarily executed by other German POW's in their POW camp. This caused great sadness, depression and fear amongst those not involved.

In 1945 at the cessation of hostilities the crew along with other naval POW's were transported by ship on the assumption that they were being re-patriated to Germany. After they had passed through the Panama Canal and entered the Atlantic, as mariners they realised quite early that they were not on a course to 'home' but to Britain. They were taken to Liverpool to contribute towards reparation and put to work on farms as laborers to make up for the casualties who failed to return to farm work in Britain because of the war years. They were held as POWs for up to four more years in the UK, before being given new suits and shoes and travel permits to return to their homes. One survivor decided to return to Britain to marry a Yorkshire farmer's daughter. The crew stayed in touch with each other and often, in later years, made a point of returning to the Kriegsmarine Memorial in Kiel, with their families, each year on 23 July. Many of the remaining crew survived until old age, the last dying in 2012.

=== Wolfpacks ===
U-527 took part in four wolfpacks, namely:

- Burggraf (24 February – 5 March 1943)
- Westmark (6 – 11 March 1943)
- Stürmer (11 – 20 March 1943)
- Seewolf (21 – 30 March 1943)

== Summary of raiding history ==
Date	Ship Name	Nationality	Tonnage (Note: Merchant ship tonnages are in gross register tons. Military vessels are listed by tons displacement.)	Fate
8 March 1943	Fort Lamy	United Kingdom	5,242	Sunk
8 March 1943	HMS LCT-2480 (Note: Carried by Fort Lamy.)	Royal Navy	291	Sunk
19 March 1943	Mathew Luckenbach	United States	5,848	Damaged

== Bibliography ==
- Busch, Rainer; Röll, Hans-Joachim (1999). German U-boat commanders of World War II : a biographical dictionary. Translated by Brooks, Geoffrey. London, Annapolis, Md: Greenhill Books, Naval Institute Press. ISBN 1-55750-186-6.
- Busch, Rainer; Röll, Hans-Joachim (1999). Deutsche U-Boot-Verluste von September 1939 bis Mai 1945 [German U-boat losses from September 1939 to May 1945]. Der U-Boot-Krieg (in German). Vol. IV. Hamburg, Berlin, Bonn: Mittler. ISBN 3-8132-0514-2.
- Edwards, Bernard (1996). Dönitz and the Wolf Packs - The U-boats at War. Cassell Military Classics. p. 169. ISBN 0-304-35203-9.
- Gröner, Erich; Jung, Dieter; Maass, Martin (1991). U-boats and Mine Warfare Vessels. German Warships 1815–1945. Vol. 2. Translated by Thomas, Keith; Magowan, Rachel. London: Conway Maritime Press. ISBN 0-85177-593-4.
