= HMS Pennywort =

Flower-class corvette

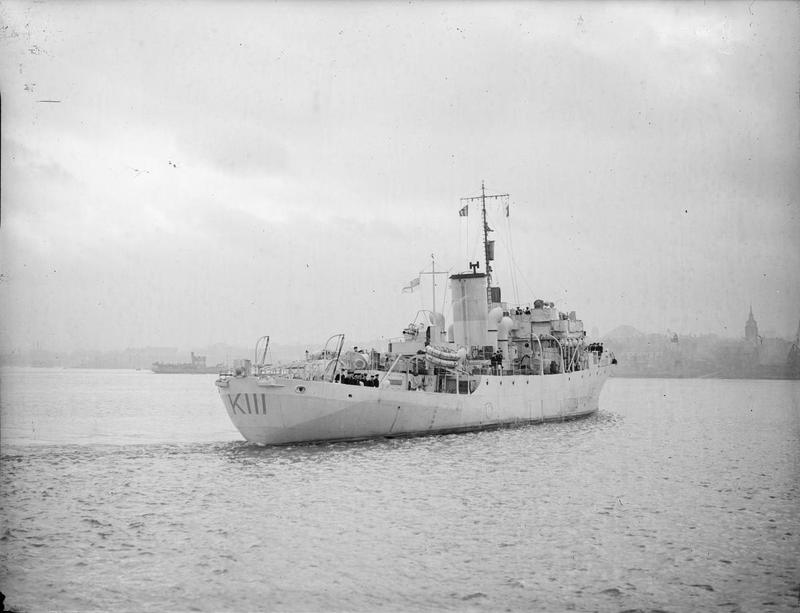
- HMS Pennyworth on the London river, 1943

History

United Kingdom
- Name: HMS Pennywort
- Ordered: 12 December 1939
- Builder: A & J Inglis Ltd.., Glasgow, Scotland
- Laid down: 11 March 1941
- Launched: 18 October 1941
- Commissioned: 5 March 1942
- Out of service: 1947 - sold
- Identification: Pennant number: K111
- Fate: Sold 1947; scrapped 1949

General characteristics
- Class & type: Flower-class corvette (original)
- Displacement: 925 long tons (940 t; 1,036 short tons)
- Length: 205 ft (62.48 m)o/a
- Beam: 33 ft (10.06 m)
- Draught: 11.5 ft (3.51 m)
- Propulsion: single shaft; 2 × fire tube Scotch boilers; 1 × 4-cycle triple-expansion reciprocating steam engine; 2,750 ihp (2,050 kW)
- Speed: 16 knots (29.6 km/h)
- Range: 3,500 nautical miles (6,482 km) at 12 knots (22.2 km/h)
- Complement: 85
- Sensors & processing systems: 1 × SW1C or 2C radar; 1 × Type 123A or Type 127DV sonar
- Armament: 1 × BL 4-inch (101.6 mm) Mk.IX single gun; 2 x double Lewis machine gun; 2 × twin Vickers machine gun; 2 × Mk.II depth charge throwers; 2 × Depth charge rails with 40 depth charges; initially with minesweeper equipment, later removed

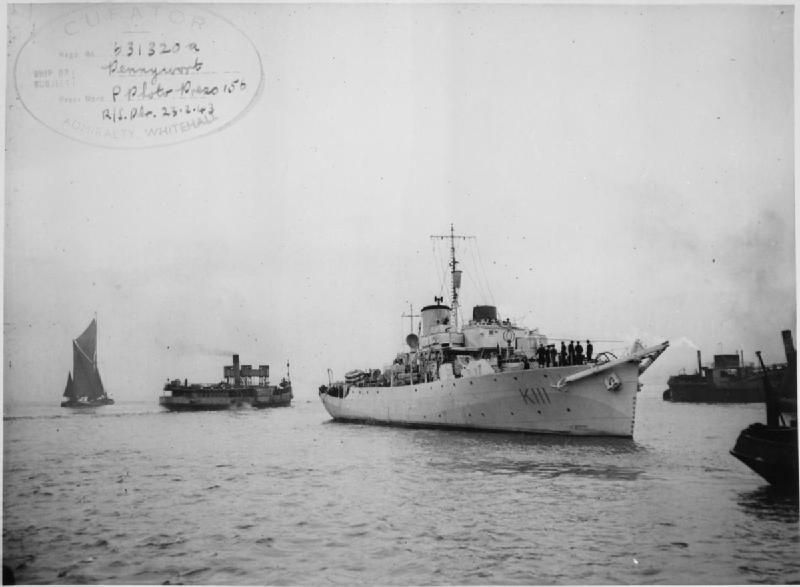
HMS Pennywort

HMS Pennywort was a Flower-class corvette that served with the Royal Navy during the Second World War. She served as an ocean escort in the Battle of the Atlantic.

== Service history ==
On 17 March 1943, she picked up 70 survivors from James Oglethorp, an American merchant torpedoed by the German submarine U-758 and Elin K., a Norwegian merchant torpedoed and sunk by U-603. On 18 March 1943, she, along with HMS Anemone picked up 54 survivors from Canadian Star, a British merchant torpedoed and sunk by U-221. On 12 August 1944, she, along with HMT Damsay, picked up 59 survivors from Orminster, a British merchant sunk by U-480.

== Sources ==
- Friedman, Norman (2008). British Destroyers & Frigates - The Second World War and After. Barnsley, UK: Seaforth Publishing. ISBN 978-1-84832-015-4.
- Gardiner, Robert (1987). Conway's All the World's Fighting Ships 1922-1946. London: Conway Maritime Press. ISBN 0-85177-146-7.
- Preston, Antony; Raven, Alan (1982). Flower Class Corvettes. London: Arms and Armour Press. ISBN 0-85368-559-2.
