= Motobomba =

The Motobomba, more properly the Motobomba FFF (Freri Fiore Filpa), was an Italian pattern-running torpedo used by Italian and German air forces during World War II. The designation FFF was derived from the last names of the three men involved with its original design: Lieutenant-Colonel Prospero Freri (it), Captain-Disegnatore Filpa, and Colonel Amedeo Fiore.

The FFF was a 500 millimetres (20 in) diameter electric torpedo which was dropped on a parachute and was designed to steer concentric spirals of between 500 and 4,000 metres (550 and 4,370 yards) until it found a target. It weighed 350 kilograms (770 lb), and contained a 120 kilograms (260 lb) warhead. Its speed was 25 knots (29 mph) and it had an endurance of 15–30 minutes. It was acknowledged by the Germans as superior to anything they had and US intelligence was eager to get its hands on it after the Armistice with Italy in September 1943.

== Development ==
The initial development work on the torpedo was carried out at Parioli, near Rome. It was demonstrated in 1935 to Benito Mussolini, Admiral Domenico Cavagnari, General Giuseppe Valle and other high officials. Freri later demonstrated it at the Germania works at Travemünde, the Luftwaffe experimental trials centre, and the Germans were sufficiently impressed to order 2,000 examples.

Five-hundred were ordered for the Regia Aeronautica, the first planned uses for them in combat to be against the British naval bases at Gibraltar and Alexandria in 1940. The limiting factor was that only the Savoia-Marchetti SM.82 bomber had the necessary power and range to deliver such a weapon over such a distance.

The first version of the FFF were designed to enter the water vertically, but it was found that a tilt device allowing it to make a gentler angled entry was less likely to upset the delicate mechanisms, and this was implemented on the second series.

== Service history ==
The first attack using the FFF was made on July 17, 1942, when three SM.82s flew from Guidonia against Gibraltar, an effort repeated on July 25, both missions aborted before launch. On the night of August 20, a Major Lucchini conducted a successful mission against Gibraltar and this was followed by attacks on targets in Albanian, Libyan, and Egyptian waters. Aircraft of 32 Stormo attacked Gibraltar once more in June 1941 and in that same month Lieutenant Torelli (based at Rhodes) attacked Alexandria harbour on the night of June 13.

The largest use of the weapon was against the PEDESTAL convoy to Malta on August 12, 1942, when ten Savoia-Marchetti SM.84s of 38 Gruppe's 32 Stormo launched them against the convoy south of Cape Spartivento, Sardinia. This made the ships of the convoy alter course, which allowed conventional attacks to penetrate the convoy's defences. This date was barely over a week after Japanese submarine I-30 had arrived at the German U-boat Base in Lorient, France on August 2, to bring the technology for the IJN's Type 91 torpedo to Nazi Germany. The Type 91 air-launched torpedo ordnance was the design used in the IJN's aerial attack on Pearl Harbor in December 1941.

By September 1942 the Italians had 80 of the improved Mk 2 version at bases in Sardinia, 50 in Sicily, and 50 more with their experimental (ASI) 5 Squadron.

The Luftwaffe made their first mass attack using the weapon on March 19, 1943, when Junkers Ju 88 torpedo bomber's launched 72 of them against shipping at Tripoli, sinking two supply ships, including Ocean Voyager, and damaging the destroyer HMS Derwent. Derwent was subsequently beached with her engine room flooded and although salvaged and returned to England, was never repaired.

The FFF was subsequently used in attacks against invasion shipping at Bône in Algeria on April 16, 1943, and at Syracuse during the Allied invasion of Sicily later that year. On December 2 a force of 105 German Ju 88s attacked Bari harbour with FFFs, destroying 16 Allied ships including the John Harvey, which had been carrying mustard gas.

== See also ==
- List of World War II torpedoes of Germany
- Type 91 torpedo, the Japanese aerial torpedo used at Pearl Harbor

== Sources ==
- Ciampaglia, Giuseppe (July 1999). "La sorprendente storia della motobomba FFF". Rivista Italiana Difesa.
