= HMS Spiraea (K08) =

Flower-class corvette

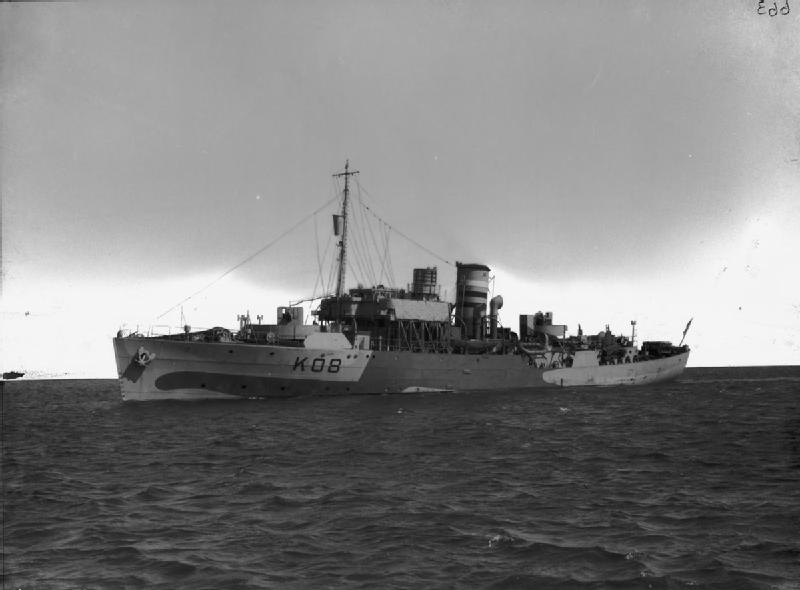
- HMS Spiraea, 25 April 1942

History

United Kingdom
- Name: HMS Spiraea
- Ordered: 21 September 1939
- Builder: Harland and Wolff (A&J Inglis)
- Yard number: 1056
- Laid down: 31 May 1940
- Launched: 31 October 1940
- Completed: 27 February 1941
- Commissioned: 27 February 1941
- Decommissioned: 1945
- Identification: Pennant number: K08
- Fate: Sold to Greece, renamed Thessaloniki

General characteristics
- Class & type: Flower-class corvette
- Displacement: 925 long tons
- Length: 205 ft (62 m) o/a
- Beam: 33 ft (10 m)
- Draught: 11 ft 6 in (3.51 m)
- Propulsion: 1 × 4-cycle triple-expansion reciprocating steam engine; 2 × fire tube Scotch boilers; Single shaft; 2,750 ihp (2,050 kW)
- Speed: 16 kn (30 km/h)
- Range: 3,500 nmi (6,500 km) at 12 kn (22 km/h)
- Complement: 85
- Sensors & processing systems: 1 × SW1C or 2C radar; 1 × Type 123A or Type 127DV sonar
- Armament: 1 × BL 4-inch (101.6 mm) Mk.IX gun; 2 × Vickers .50 cal machine gun (twin); 2 × Lewis .303 cal machine gun (twin); 2 × Mk.II Depth charge throwers; 2 × Depth charge rails with 40 depth charges

HMS Spiraea was a Flower-class corvette of the British Royal Navy. Named for a genus of shrub, Spiraea served in the Second World War as an escort.

The corvette was launched on 31 October 1940 at Glasgow, Scotland and entered nominal service on 27 February 1941. In 1943, she recovered the survivors of two separate sinkings (the merchant vessels Oporto and Fort Howe), of which the Fort Howe effort was in conjunction with HMS Alisma.

== Fate ==
Spiraea was sold to Greece in August 1945 and became the Thessaloniki.
