= HMCS Dauphin =

Flower-class corvette

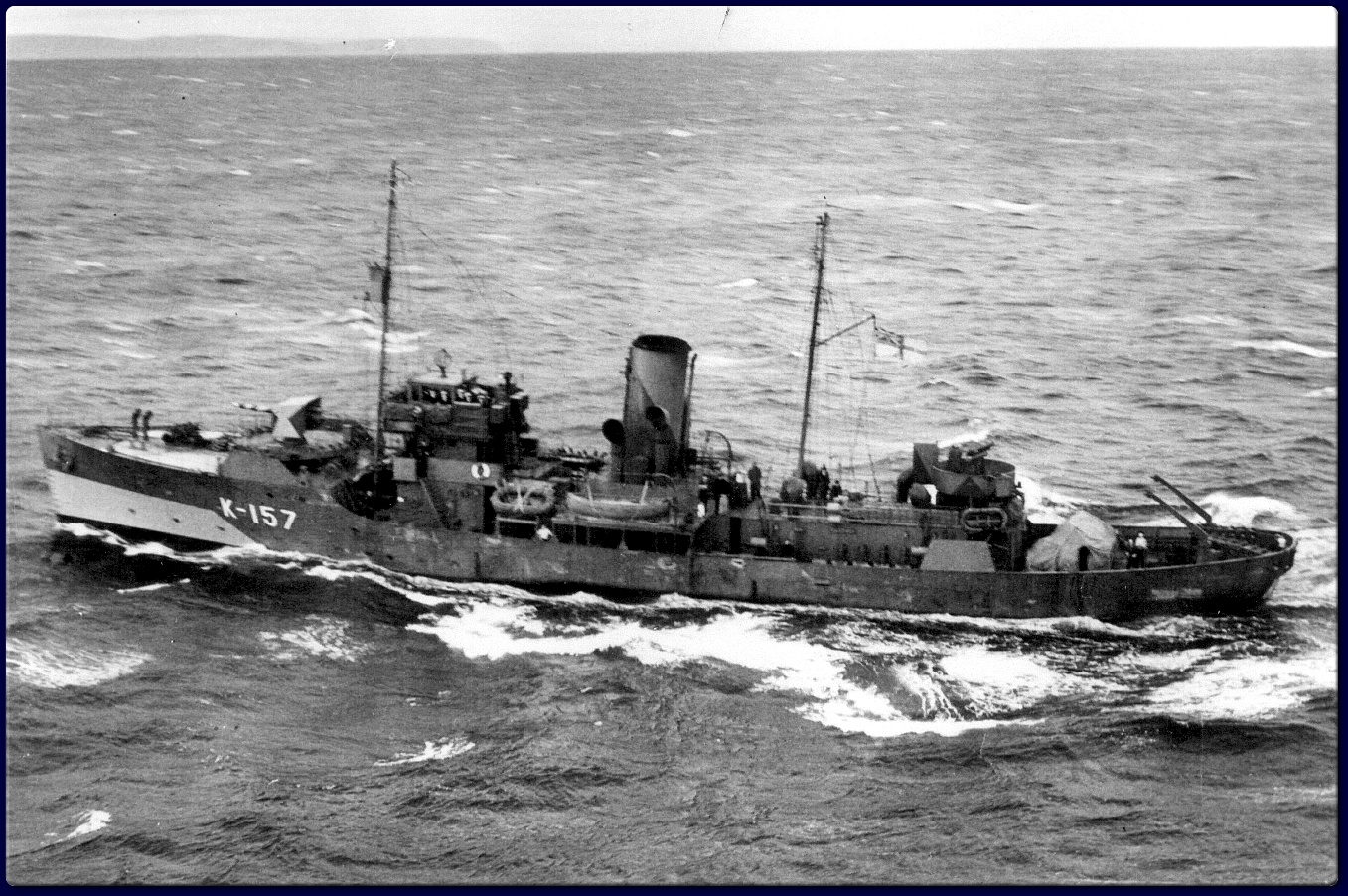
- HMCS Dauphin at Pictou, Nova Scotia.

History

Canada
- Name: Dauphin
- Namesake: Dauphin, Manitoba
- Operator: Royal Canadian Navy
- Ordered: 20 January 1940
- Builder: Canadian Vickers Ltd., Montreal
- Laid down: 6 July 1940
- Launched: 24 October 1940
- Commissioned: 17 May 1941
- Decommissioned: 20 June 1945
- Identification: Pennant number: K157
- Honours and awards: Atlantic 1941-45
- Fate: Sold for civilian use as Cortes in 1949 and renamed San Antonio in 1955.

General characteristics
- Class & type: Flower-class corvette (original)
- Displacement: 925 long tons (940 t; 1,036 short tons)
- Length: 205 ft (62.48 m)o/a
- Beam: 33 ft (10.06 m)
- Draught: 11.5 ft (3.51 m)
- Propulsion: single shaft; 2 × fire tube Scotch boilers; 1 × 4-cycle triple-expansion reciprocating steam engine; 2,750 ihp (2,050 kW)
- Speed: 16 knots (29.6 km/h)
- Range: 3,500 nautical miles (6,482 km) at 12 knots (22.2 km/h)
- Complement: 85
- Sensors & processing systems: 1 × SW1C or 2C radar; 1 × Type 123A or Type 127DV sonar
- Armament: 1 × BL 4 in (102 mm) Mk.IX single gun; 2 × .50 cal machine gun (twin); 2 × Lewis .303 cal machine gun (twin); 2 × Mk.II depth charge throwers; 2 × depth charge rails with 40 depth charges; originally fitted with minesweeping gear, later removed

HMCS Dauphin was a Flower-class corvette that served in the Royal Canadian Navy during the Second World War. She served primarily as a convoy escort in the Battle of the Atlantic. She was named for Dauphin, Manitoba.

== Background ==
Flower-class corvettes like Dauphin serving with the Royal Canadian Navy during the Second World War were different from earlier and more traditional sail-driven corvettes. The "corvette" designation was created by the French as a class of small warships; the Royal Navy borrowed the term for a period but discontinued its use in 1877. During the hurried preparations for war in the late 1930s, Winston Churchill reactivated the corvette class, needing a name for smaller ships used in an escort capacity, in this case based on a whaling ship design. The generic name "flower" was used to designate the class of these ships, which – in the Royal Navy – were named after flowering plants.

Corvettes commissioned by the Royal Canadian Navy during the Second World War were named after communities for the most part, to better represent the people who took part in building them. This idea was put forth by Admiral Percy W. Nelles. Sponsors were commonly associated with the community for which the ship was named. Royal Navy corvettes were designed as open sea escorts, while Canadian corvettes were developed for coastal auxiliary roles which was exemplified by their minesweeping gear. Eventually the Canadian corvettes would be modified to allow them to perform better on the open seas.

== Construction ==
Dauphin was ordered 20 January 1940 as part of the 1939-1940 Flower-class shipbuilding program. She was laid down 6 July 1940 by Canadian Vickers Ltd. at Montreal, Quebec and launched on 24 October later that year. She was commissioned on 17 May 1941 at Montreal. From April to September 1943, Dauphin was refitted at Pictou. During this time her fo'c'sle was extended. In August 1944 she underwent another refit at Liverpool, Nova Scotia.

== Wartime service ==
In late June 1941 Dauphin joined Sydney Force. In September of that year she transferred to Newfoundland Command. However she was sent for further workups at Tobermory and returned to service as an ocean escort in mid-October.

From October 1941 to August 1944 she was an ocean escort. After December 1942 she was assigned to escort group EG A-3, which was re-designated C-5 in June 1943. Dauphin was involved in three major convoy battles during that time; SC 100 in September 1942, ON 166 in February 1943 and SC 121 in March 1943.

U-boats repeatedly attacked SC 121 from 6 to 10 March. On the night of 9–10 March U-229 torpedoed the tramp steamers Nailsea Court, which sank, and Colmore, which was damaged and abandoned. Dauphin tried to reach a lifeboat containing 37 men from the two ships. She got within 250 yards of the boat when her steering gear failed, forcing her to stop. It took Dauphin four hours to repair her steering gear and return to the boat. By then it had capsized and she rescued only three survivors who were clinging to the keel.

Daulhin was removed from convoy duty from April to September 1943 for a refit. In January 1945 she was reassigned to the Western Local Escort Force escort group W-7. She remained with the group until the end of the war.

=== Trans-Atlantic convoys escorted ===
Convoy	Escort Group	Dates	Notes
SC 36		1–4 July 1941	Newfoundland to Iceland
HX 138		13 July 1941	Newfoundland to Iceland
HX 139		17–18 July 1941	Newfoundland to Iceland
SC 38		22–25 July 1941	Newfoundland to Iceland
HX 143		6-7 Aug 1941	Newfoundland to Iceland
HX 142		8 Aug 1941	Newfoundland to Iceland
HX 144		11-12 Aug 1941	Newfoundland to Iceland
SC 43		5-20 Sept 1941	Newfoundland to Iceland
SC 53		6-20 Nov 1941	Newfoundland to Iceland
ON 38		26-30 Nov 1941	Iceland to Newfoundland
SC 60		18-24 Dec 1941	Newfoundland to Iceland
ON 53		3-9 Jan 1942	Iceland to Newfoundland
SC 67		2-12 Feb 1942	Newfoundland to Iceland
ON 66		18-26 Feb 1942	Iceland to Newfoundland
SC 73		10–23 March 1942	Newfoundland to Northern Ireland
ON 80		28 March – 10 April 1942	Northern Ireland to Newfoundland
SC 89	MOEF group C2	28 June – 9 July 1942	Newfoundland to Northern Ireland
ON 113	MOEF group C2	18–26 July 1942	Northern Ireland to Newfoundland
HX 201	MOEF group C2	5-9 Aug 1942	Newfoundland to Iceland
ON 119	MOEF group C2	10-15 Aug 1942	Iceland to Newfoundland
SC 97	MOEF group C2	26 Aug – 6 Sept 1942	Newfoundland to Northern Ireland
ON 129	MOEF group C2	11-20 Sept 1942	Northern Ireland to Newfoundland
HX 210	MOEF group C3	4-7 Oct 1942	Newfoundland to Northern Ireland
HX 211	MOEF group C1	13-20 Oct 1942	Newfoundland to Northern Ireland
ON 147	MOEF group C4	18-28 Nov 1942	Northern Ireland to Newfoundland
SC 111	MOEF group A3	1-14 Dec 1942	Newfoundland to Northern Ireland
ON 156	MOEF group A3	24 Dec 1942 – 8 Jan 1943	Northern Ireland to Newfoundland
HX 223	MOEF group A3	19-28 Jan 1943	Newfoundland to Northern Ireland
SC 117	MOEF group B3	29 Jan – 2 Feb 1943	Newfoundland to Northern Ireland
Convoy ON 166	MOEF group A3	12-21 Feb 1943	Northern Ireland to Newfoundland
Convoy SC 121	MOEF group A3	3–12 March 1943	Newfoundland to Northern Ireland
ON 175	MOEF group A3	25 March – 8 April 1943	Northern Ireland to Newfoundland
HX 262		24 Oct – 2 Nov 1943	Newfoundland to Northern Ireland
ON 211		14-24 Nov 1943	Northern Ireland to Newfoundland
HX 268		1-10 Dec 1943	Newfoundland to Northern Ireland
ON 217		25 Dec 1943 – 5 Jan 1944	Northern Ireland to Newfoundland
HX 274		11-21 Jan 1944	Newfoundland to Northern Ireland
ON 222		31 Jan – 10 Feb 1944	Northern Ireland to Newfoundland
ONS 31		14–25 March 1944	Northern Ireland to Newfoundland
HX 285		2–11 April 1944	Newfoundland to Northern Ireland
ON 233		20 April – 3 May 1944	Northern Ireland to Newfoundland
HX 290		10–19 May 1944	Newfoundland to Northern Ireland
ON 238		27 May – 3 June 1944	Northern Ireland to Newfoundland
HX 295		15–23 June 1944	Newfoundland to Northern Ireland
ON 243		3–12 July 1944	Northern Ireland to Newfoundland
HX 300	MOEF group C5	24 July – 2 Aug 1944	Newfoundland to Northern Ireland; largest HX convoy of the war
ON 248S		11-21 Aug 1944	Northern Ireland to Newfoundland
SC 165	Western Local Escort Force (WLEF)	16-20 Jan 1945	Halifax to Newfoundland
ON 278	WLEF	24-31 Jan 1945	Newfoundland to Halifax
HX 336	WLEF	2-5 Feb 1945	Halifax to Newfoundland
ON 280	WLEF	6-7 Feb 1945	Newfoundland to Halifax
SC 167	WLEF	2-16 Feb 1945	Halifax to Newfoundland
ONS 42	WLEF	28 Feb – 4 March 1945	Newfoundland to Halifax
SC 170	WLEF	17–20 March 1945	Halifax to Newfoundland
ON 290	WLEF	24–29 March March 1945	Newfoundland to Halifax
HX 348	WLEF	3–6 April 1945	Halifax to Newfoundland
HX 350	WLEF	15–18 April 1945	Halifax to Newfoundland
ON 296	WLEF	24–30 April 1945	Newfoundland to Halifax
HX 354	WLEF	3–6 May 1945	Halifax to Newfoundland
SC 176	WLEF	16–20 May 1945	Halifax to Newfoundland
ONS 50	WLEF	25–29 May 1945	Newfoundland to Halifax

== Post-war service ==
Following the end of hostilities, Dauphin was paid off on 20 June 1945 at Sorel, Quebec. She was sold for conversion to a merchant ship and in 1949 entered service as Cortes under a Honduran flag. In 1955 she was renamed San Antonio and was registered under an Ecuadorean flag. The ship was deleted in 1992.
