= Convoy SC 121 =

Convoy during naval battles of the Second World War

- Part of Battle of the Atlantic
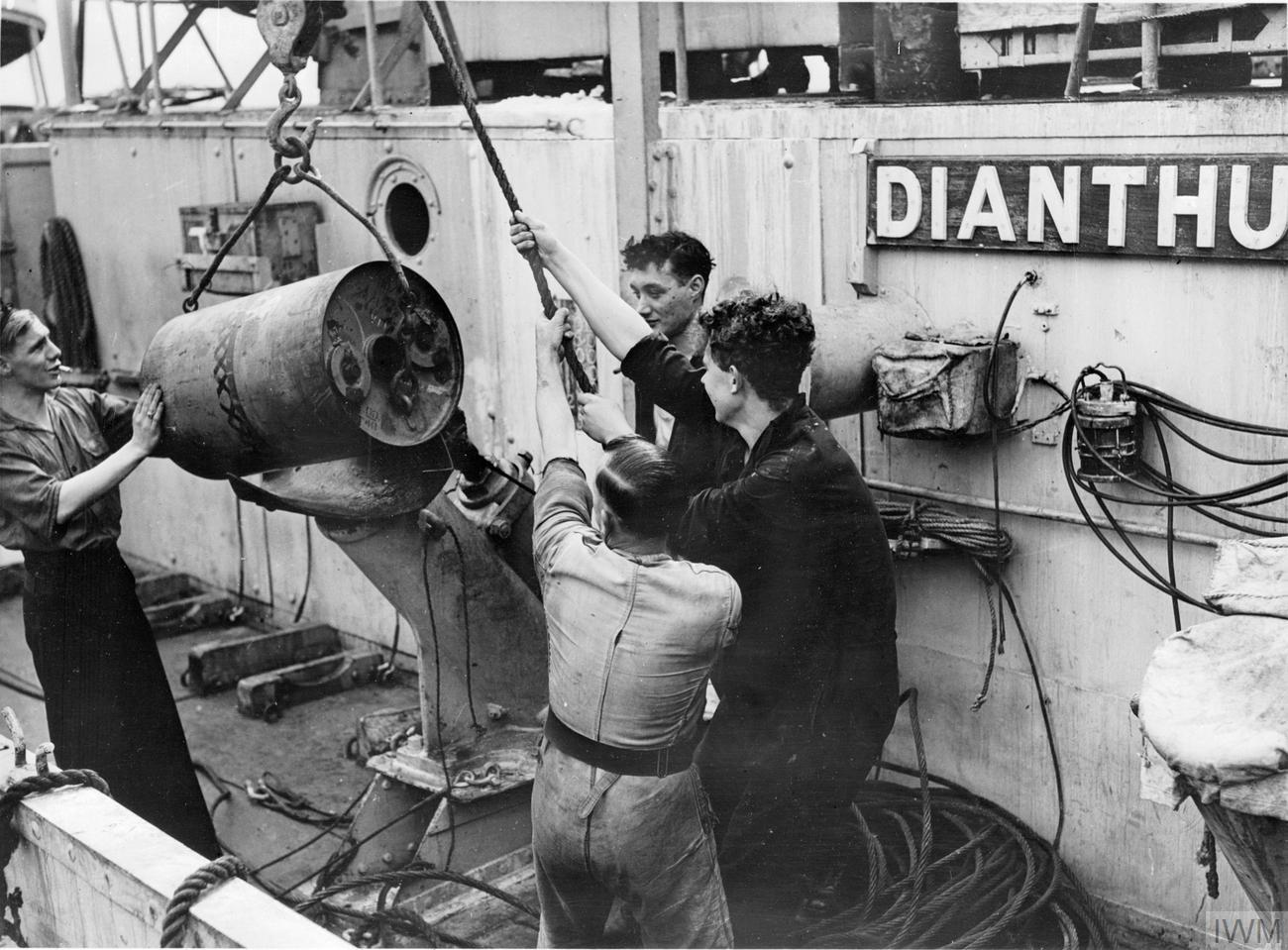
- A depth charge being loaded onto a depth-charge thrower aboard the corvette HMS Dianthus
Date	6–10 March 1943
Location	North Atlantic
Result	German victory

Belligerents
United Kingdom; United States; Canada	Germany

Commanders and leaders
Capt. H.C. Birnie RNR†; Capt. P.R. Heineman USN	Admiral Karl Dönitz

Strength
69 freighters 2 destroyers 3 cutters 4 corvettes	27 submarines

Casualties and losses
12 freighters sunk (55,673 GRT); 270 killed/drowned	none

Convoy SC 121 was the 121st of the numbered series of World War II slow convoys of merchant ships from Sydney, Cape Breton Island to Liverpool. The ships departed New York City 23 February 1943; and were met by the Mid-Ocean Escort Force Group A-3 consisting of the United States Coast Guard (USCG) Treasury-class cutter USCGC Spencer, the American Wickes-class destroyer USS Greer, the British and Canadian Flower-class corvettes HMS Dianthus, HMCS Rosthern, HMCS Trillium and HMCS Dauphin and the convoy rescue ship Melrose Abbey. Three of the escorts had defective sonar and three had unserviceable radar.

== Background ==
As western Atlantic coastal convoys brought an end to the second happy time, Admiral Karl Dönitz, the Befehlshaber der U-Boote (BdU) or commander in chief of U-Boats, shifted focus to the mid-Atlantic to avoid aircraft patrols. Although convoy routing was less predictable in the mid-ocean, Dönitz anticipated that the increased numbers of U-boats being produced would be able to find convoys with the advantage of intelligence gained through B-Dienst decryption of British Naval Cypher Number 3. Only 20 percent of the 180 trans-Atlantic convoys, from the end of July 1942 until the end of April 1943, lost ships to U-boat attack.

== Battle ==
On 6 March U-405 sighted the convoy, which had been scattered by nine consecutive days of northwesterly Force 10 gales and snow squalls. The storm damaged the radio communication system aboard the escort commander's ship Spencer and Dauphin had to leave the convoy with damaged steering gear. U-230 torpedoed the British freighter Egyptian on the night of 6–7 March. The British freighter Empire Impala stopped to rescue survivors and was torpedoed after dawn by U-591.

U-190 torpedoed the British freighter Empire Lakeland when the gale subsided on 8 March and four more stragglers were sunk by U-526, U-527, U-591, and U-642. On 9 March the convoy escort was reinforced by No. 120 Squadron RAF B-24 Liberators from Northern Ireland and by the Wickes-class destroyer USS Babbitt and the Treasury-class cutters USCGC Bibb and USCGC Ingham from Iceland.

U-530 torpedoed straggling Swedish freighter Milos on the evening of 9 March. That night U-405 torpedoed the Norwegian freighter Bonneville while U-229 torpedoed the British freighter Nailsea Court and U-409 torpedoed the British escort oiler Rosewood and American ammunition ship Malantic.

The Flower-class corvettes HMS Campion and Mallow reinforced the convoy escort on 10 March, and the convoy reached Liverpool on 14 March. Only 76 of the 275 crewmen of the sunken ships were rescued.

== Ships in convoy ==
Name	Flag	Dead	Tonnage (GRT)	Cargo	Notes
Alcoa Leader (1919)	United States		5,041	Petrol	
Astrid (1942)	Norway		2,861	Sugar	
Badjestan (1928)	United Kingdom		5,573	Wheat	
Baldbutte (1919)	United States		6,295		
Bengkalis (1918)	Netherlands		6,453	General cargo	Survived this convoy and convoy ONS 5
Bonneville (1929)	Norway	36	4,665	7,196 tons explosives & general cargo	Carried convoy commodore Capt H.C. Birnie DSO RD RNR; sunk by U-405 10 Mar
Brant County (1915)	Norway		5,001	General cargo	Returned to Halifax
British Freedom (1928)	United Kingdom		6,985	Furnace fuel oil	
British Progress (1927)	United Kingdom		4,581	Petrol	Veteran of convoy SC 104
Camerata (1931)	United Kingdom		4,875	Iron ore	
Clunepark (1928)	United Kingdom		3,491	Phosphates	
Coulmore (1936)	United Kingdom		3,670	General cargo	Torpedoed, but towed and salvaged
Dilworth (1919)	United States		7,045	Gas oil	
Egton (1938)	United Kingdom		4,363	Iron ore	
Egyptian (1920)	United Kingdom	44	2,868	Oilseed, palm oil & tin ore	Sunk by U-230 7 Mar
El Grillo (1922)	United Kingdom		7,264	Fuel oil	
Empire Advocate (1913)	United Kingdom		5,787	General cargo	Survived this convoy and convoy ONS 5
Empire Bunting (1919)	United Kingdom		6,448	General cargo	Arrived in tow after steering failure on 11 March
Empire Caxton (1942)	United Kingdom		2,873	Bauxite	
Empire Forest (1942)	United Kingdom		7,025	General cargo	
Empire Grebe (1918)	United Kingdom		5,736	General cargo	
Empire Impala (1920)	United Kingdom	48	6,116	7,628 tons general cargo	Sunk by U-591 while picking up survivors 7 Mar
Empire Keats (1942)	United Kingdom		7,035	West African produce	Carried convoy vice commodore Capt A Cocks DSC RD RNR
Empire Lakeland (1942)	United Kingdom		7,015	Refrigerated and general cargo	Straggled and sunk by U-190
Empire Opossum (1918)	United Kingdom		5,644	Grain	
Empire Planet (1923)	United Kingdom		4,290	General cargo	Survived this convoy and convoy ONS 5
Eskdalegate (1930)	United Kingdom		4,250	Iron ore	
Fort Lamy (1919)	United Kingdom		5,242	Steel & general cargo	Veteran of convoy ON 154; straggled and sunk by U-527 8 Mar
Fort Remy (1943)	United Kingdom		7,127	General cargo	
Garnes (1930)	Norway		1,559		Veteran of convoy SC 104
Gascony (1925)	United Kingdom		4,716	General cargo	
Gatineau Park (1942)	United Kingdom		7,128	General cargo	Fitted with Admiralty Net Defence
Guido (1920)	United Kingdom		3,921	Sugar & cotton	Romped and sunk by U-633 8 Mar
Hallfried (1918)	Norway		2,968	Flour	
Harpefjell (1939)	Norway		1,333	General cargo	
Harperly (1930)	United Kingdom		4,586	Bauxite	Survived to be sunk 2 months later in convoy ONS 5
Hollywood (1920)	United States		5,498	General cargo	Veteran of convoy PQ 18
Katendrecht (1925)	Netherlands		5,099	Gas oil	
Kingswood (1929)	United Kingdom		5,080	General cargo	
L V Stanford (1921)	United States		7,138	Furnace fuel oil	Veteran of convoy SC 107
USS Laramie (1919)	United States		5,450		Detached for Greenland
Leadgate (1925)	United Kingdom		2,125	Flour	Straggled and sunk by U-642 8 Mar
Lobos (1921)	United Kingdom		6,479	Tin & general cargo	
Lombardy (1921)	United Kingdom		3,379	General cargo	
Lorient (1921)	United Kingdom		4,737	Steel & lumber	Veteran of convoy SC 42; survived to be sunk 2 months later in convoy ONS 5
Malantic (1929)	United States	25	3,837	8,000 tons ammunition	Veteran of convoy SC 107; sunk by U-409 9 Mar
Manchester Progress (1938)	United Kingdom		5,620	General cargo	
Melrose Abbey (1929)	United Kingdom		1,924		convoy rescue ship
Miguel de Larrinaga (1924)	United Kingdom		5,231	Tobacco	Veteran of convoy SC 42
Milos (1898)	Sweden	30	3,058	804 tons steel & lumber	Sunk by U-530 11 Mar
Morska Wola (1924)	Poland		3,208	General cargo	Veteran of convoy HX 84
Nadin (1904)	Greece		3,582	Steel & lumber	
Nailsea Court (1936)	United Kingdom	45	4,946	7,661 tons copper & general cargo	Sunk by U-229 10 Mar
Parkhaven (1920)	Netherlands		4,803	General cargo	
Porjus (1906)	Sweden		2,965	Steel & pulp	Veteran of convoy SC 104; returned to port & sailed with convoy SC 122
Raranga (1916)	United Kingdom		10,043	Refrigerated & general cargo	
Ravnefjell (1938)	Norway		1,339	General cargo	Veteran of convoy HX 79 & convoy ON 154; survived this convoy & convoy SC 130
Reaverley (1940)	United Kingdom		4,998	Bauxite	Returned to port
Rosewood (1931)	United Kingdom	42	5,989	Furnace fuel oil	Escort oiler; sunk by U-409 9 Mar
San Tirso (1913)	United Kingdom		6,266	Furnace fuel oil	
Scorton (1939)	United Kingdom		4,813	Sugar	
Sinnington Court (1928)	United Kingdom		6,910	General cargo	Veteran of convoy SC 104
Suderoy (1913)	Norway		7,562	Fuel oil	Veteran of convoy SC 104
Sutlej (1940)	United Kingdom		5,189	General cargo	
Thraki (1941)	Greece		7,460	Grain & general cargo	
Trontolite (1918)	United Kingdom		7,115		
Vancolite (1928)	United Kingdom		11,404		
Vojvoda Putnik (1916)	Yugoslavia		5,879	Wheat	Straggled and sunk by U-591
Zouave (1930)	United Kingdom		4,256	Iron ore	Returned to port to be sunk sailing with convoy SC 122

== See also ==
- Convoy Battles of World War II

== Bibliography ==
- Hague, Arnold (2000). The Allied Convoy System 1939–1945. Naval Institute Press. ISBN 1-55750-019-3.
- Milner, Marc (1985). North Atlantic Run. Naval Institute Press. ISBN 0-87021-450-0.
- Morison, Samuel Eliot (1975). History of United States Naval Operations in World War II, Volume I The Battle of the Atlantic 1939–1943. Little, Brown and Company.
- Rohwer, J; Hummelchen, G (1992). Chronology of the War at Sea 1939–1945. Naval Institute Press. ISBN 1-55750-105-X.
- Tarrant, VE (1989). The U-Boat Offensive 1914–1945. Arms and Armour. ISBN 1-85409-520-X.
