= Harry Charles Birnie =

Scottish naval officer

Captain Harry Charles Birnie DSO RD
- Born: 1 October 1882; New Aberdour, Aberdeenshire
- Died: 9 March 1943 (aged 60); North Atlantic
- Military career
- Allegiance: United Kingdom
- Branch: Royal Naval Reserve
- Service years: 1904–1919; 1940–1943
- Rank: Commodore
- Commands: HM Torpedo Boat 82; HMS Fairy; HMS P-57
- Conflicts: World War I World War II: Atlantic War; SC convoys; Convoy SC 121 †
- Awards: Distinguished Service Order
- Other work: Sea captain

Harry Charles Birnie DSO RD (1 October 1882 – 9 March 1943) was a Scottish sea captain and naval officer. His peacetime seafaring career was spent with the Cunard Line. He also served in the Royal Navy in both World Wars, being killed in action while in command of a merchant convoy in the North Atlantic in 1943.

== Early life ==
Birnie was the son of Reverend C. Birnie, MA, and Katherine Birnie, of New Aberdour, in Aberdeenshire, Scotland.

== Cunard service ==
Birnie served as a junior officer on Campania, under Sir Arthur Henry Rostron. On 26 April 1907, Rostron and Birnie are said to have observed a sea monster. Rostron wrote about the episode in his autobiography, while Birnie confirmed the account several years later.

During the inter-war years, Birnie returned to the Cunard Line, eventually reaching the rank of captain at a young age. He made numerous Atlantic crossings in command of the Mauretania, Berengaria and Aquitania.

== Naval service ==
=== World War I ===
While employed by the Cunard Line, Birnie was also a member of the Royal Naval Reserve, having been commissioned as a sub-lieutenant in 1904, and promoted to lieutenant on 12 December 1907.

During World War I, Birnie served in the Royal Navy, commanding HM Torpedo Boat 82 in 1915, and the destroyer Fairy in the North Sea in 1916–1917.

On 18 November 1917, while in command of the patrol boat HMS P-57, Lieutenant-Commander Birnie sank a German submarine, UC-47, off Flamborough Head, Yorkshire, initially by ramming it at near full-speed, then dropping depth charges. He received the Distinguished Service Order for this exploit in February 1918, while the Admiralty awarded a "kill" bonus of £1,000 to be shared by the crew of HMS P-57.

=== World War II ===
During World War II, Birnie served from 1940 onwards, holding the rank of acting-commodore (2nd class) and attached to HMS Eaglet. He commanded several convoys, carrying men and materiel across the Atlantic; including Convoys ON 50, UR 32, ON 162, and SC 121. In December 1942, Birnie was mentioned in despatches: "For outstanding devotion to duty during two years' arduous service as [a] commodore of convoys."

== Death ==
In February and March 1943, Birnie was in command of Convoy SC 121 from New York to Liverpool, sailing in the Norwegian merchant ship Bonneville. On 9 March 1943, the Bonneville was struck by a torpedo, apparently fired by the U-405. Birnie was amongst those lost. He initially stayed on Bonneville after she was hit, but eventually he and one of his staff jumped overboard from the after end of the ship. Some other survivors on a raft saw them in the water but were unable to maneuver the raft to them. It was reported that this convoy was to be his last.

He is memorialised on the Liverpool Naval Memorial for sailors of the Royal Navy Reserve who were lost at sea during World War II. There is also a headstone commemorating him at the New Aberdour Old Churchyard.

== Trinity House ==
Birnie was an Elder Brother of Trinity House, a non-departmental public body of the United Kingdom responsible for maritime safety. As part of his functions, he served as a nautical assessor in the British courts, including in the Judicial Committee of the Privy Council.
