= SS Nailsea Meadow =

Coordinates: 32°04′S 29°13′E

History

United Kingdom
- Name: Nailsea Meadow
- Owner: Bantham SS Co Ltd
- Operator: Evans & Reid
- Port of registry: Cardiff
- Builder: Bartram & Sons, Sunderland
- Yard number: 274
- Launched: 18 December 1936
- Completed: 23 February 1937
- Identification: UK official number 162118; call sign GZKW
- Fate: Sunk, 11 May 1943

General characteristics
- Type: Cargo ship
- Tonnage: 4,962 GRT; 2,943 NRT
- Length: 420.3 ft (128.1 m)
- Beam: 56.0 ft (17.1 m)
- Depth: 25.4 ft (7.7 m)
- Decks: 1
- Installed power: 255 NHP
- Propulsion: 4-cylinder compound engine plus exhaust steam turbine
- Speed: 10 knots (19 km/h)
- Crew: 37 plus 7 DEMS gunners
- Sensors & processing systems: wireless direction finding
- Notes: sister ships: Nailsea Court, Nailsea Manor, Nailsea Moor

SS Nailsea Meadow was a UK cargo steamship. She was launched in 1936 in Sunderland, England, and sunk by a U-boat in the Indian Ocean in 1943.

== Building ==
In 1936–37 Bartram & Sons built four sister ships for two companies linked to Evans and Reid of Cardiff. Nailsea Court and Nailsea Meadow were launched in 1936. Nailsea Moor and Nailsea Manor were launched in 1937.

Nailsea Meadow was the second of the four sisters to be built. She was launched on 17 December 1936 and completed in February 1937.

Unusually for steamships built in the 1930s the four sisters each had a compound engine. Triple-expansion engines had largely superseded compound engines in the 1860s. But in these four sisters the compound engine was combined with an exhaust steam turbine to achieve a third stage of steam expansion and hence economy in bunkering.

The compound engine had two high- and two low-pressure cylinders and drove the propeller shaft by single-reduction gearing. Exhaust steam from its two low-pressure cylinders powered a single exhaust steam turbine, which drove the same propeller shaft via double-reduction gearing. The compound engine was made by White's Marine Engineering Company of Hebburn. The compound engine plus exhaust turbine gave Nailsea Meadow a speed of 10 knots (19 km/h).

== War service ==
When the Second World War broke out in September 1939 Nailsea Meadow was in the Indian Ocean. She called at various Persian Gulf ports before leaving Bushehr on 30 October 1939. She returned home via the Suez Canal. At Gibraltar on 19 November she joined her first convoy, HG 9, which got her to Liverpool on 8 December.

Nailsea Meadow made several transatlantic crossings in the Battle of the Atlantic: eastbound in HX or SC convoys but westbound mostly unescorted. Between February 1940 and December 1941 she sailed in four HX convoys from Halifax, Nova Scotia to Liverpool and two SC convoys from Sydney, Nova Scotia to Liverpool. Her cargoes to the UK were most often grain and sometimes included timber.

In July 1940 Nailsea Meadow passed through the Panama Canal. She called at various ports on the Pacific coast of the US and Canada before returning through Panama in September with a cargo of timber. She returned home via Bermuda, where she joined Convoy BHX 76 which converged with Convoy HX 76 to reach the UK.

In May 1941 Harry Finestone, sometime Chief Officer on Nailsea Meadow, was formally commended for "brave conduct" during an enemy attack on the ship. The commendation does not state where or when the attack was, or whether it was by submarine, surface vessel or aircraft.

In January 1942 Nailsea Meadow crossed the North Atlantic westbound unescorted to New York City. From there she sailed unescorted to Bombay via Trinidad, Cape Town and Durban and back via Cape Town and Hampton Roads, returning to New York in October 1942.

Nailsea Meadow left New York on 6 December 1942. She sailed via Guantánamo in Cuba in convoys NG 327 and GAT 29, and spent Christmas 1942 and New Year 1943 in Trinidad. On 6 January she left Trinidad for Brazil, sailing in Convoy TB 1 as far as Bahia. From 8 February to 26 March 1943 she was in Rio de Janeiro. She then sailed unescorted to Cape Town, where she was in port from 19 April to 8 May.

=== Loss ===
On 8 May 1943 Nailsea Meadow left Cape Town for Bombay and Karachi with 7,104 tons of cargo including war materials and mail. At 2340 hrs on 11 May 1943 the German submarine U-196 torpedoed Nailsea Meadow 40 miles south of Port St. Johns, South Africa, killing two of her crew. The SAAF rescue launch R 6 rescued her Master, Eric Lambert, 34 of his crew and seven DEMS gunners the next day.

== Wreck ==
In 1997 Emlyn Brown, working with the National Underwater and Marine Agency and Clive Cussler, found Nailsea Meadow's wreck. At first they wrongly identified it as Waratah. On re-examination in 2001 it was identified as Nailsea Meadow.

The wreck is approximately 14 miles offshore and exposed to the fast-moving Agulhas Current. Divers have attempted to dive the wreck but due to the fast current, these attempts have not been successful. In May 2015, South African technical divers conducted a successful expedition to dive on the MTS Oceanos and the SS Nailsea Meadow.

On 27 May 2015 the dive team, Mark Andrews, Alan Drake and Brett Louw, executed the first trimix closed circuit rebreather (CCR) dives on the wreck for a total dive time of approximately 150 minutes. The divers were supported by Keryn van der Walt, Nick "Buffalo" Fourie and Sonia Louw. On 28 May 2015 the dive team took advantage of favourable weather and ocean conditions and executed a second dive on the wreck. Mark Andrews recorded video footage of both dives.
