= SS Waratah =

Ship lost off South Africa in 1909

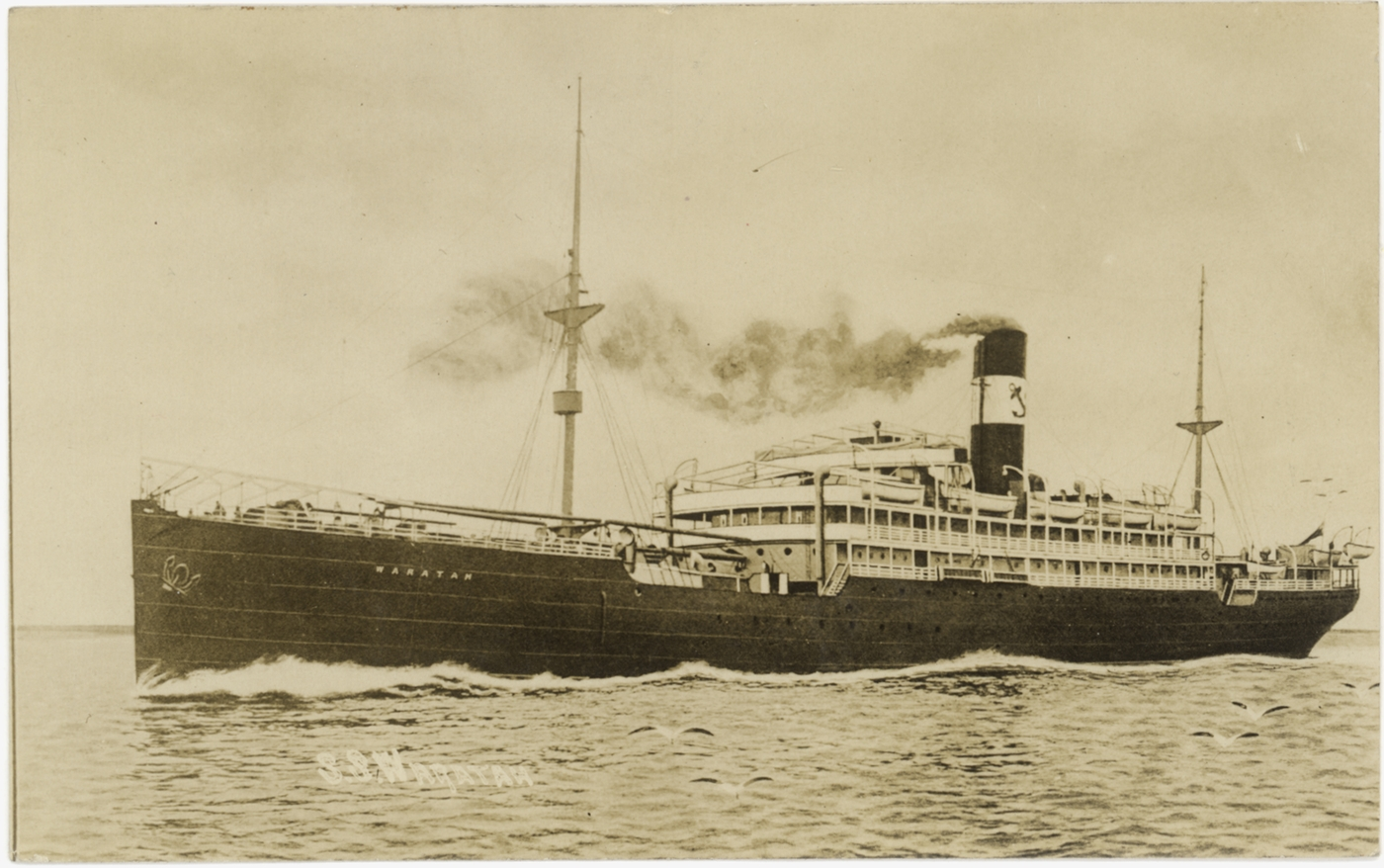
- Postcard of Waratah, November 1908

History

United Kingdom
- Name: Waratah
- Namesake: Waratah (Telopea speciosissima)
- Owner: William Lund & Sons, 3 East India Avenue, E.C., London.
- Operator: Blue Anchor Line
- Port of registry: London
- Route: London – Cape Town – Durban – Adelaide – Melbourne – Sydney
- Ordered: September 1907
- Builder: Barclay, Curle & Co, Whiteinch
- Cost: £139,900
- Yard number: 472
- Launched: 12 September 1908
- Sponsored by: Elizabeth Ann Bassett Taverner
- Completed: 23 October 1908
- Maiden voyage: 5 November 1908
- Identification: UK official number 125741; code letters HNGM
- Fate: Disappeared off the coast of South Africa 28 July 1909.
- Notes: Last reported seen 27 July 1909 by Clan Maclntyre

General characteristics
- Type: Steamship (passenger, cargo, and mail)
- Tonnage: 9,339 GRT; 6,004 NRT; 10,000 DWT
- Length: 465.0 ft (141.7 m)
- Beam: 59.4 ft (18.1 m)
- Depth: 35.0 ft (10.7 m)
- Decks: 4
- Installed power: 1,003 nhp
- Propulsion: 2 × 4-cylinder quadruple expansion engines
- Speed: About 13.5 kn (25.0 km/h) service speed.
- Capacity: Certified to carry 128 in First Class and 160 in Third Class for a total of 288 passengers. (Temporary dorms could be fitted into the tween decks cargo holds which could accommodate an additional 500 Third Class émigrés.)
- Crew: Certified for a maximum of 144, though this number fluctuated based on need and passenger load.
- Notes: Waratah had lifeboat and liferaft capacity for 921 people

Waratah was a commercial steamship of the British Blue Anchor Line engaged in the transportation of passengers, cargo and mail between London and Sydney at the turn of the 20th century. On the night of 27–28 July 1909 and while on only her second voyage, Waratah, along with 92 passengers and a crew of 119, disappeared somewhere between Durban and Cape Town off the South African coast. No wreckage or remains have ever been found and Waratah's fate remains a mystery to this day.

== Design and construction ==
On 15 September 1907, William Lund and Sons shipping company, doing business as the Blue Anchor Line, contracted with Barclay, Curle and Company shipbuilders of Glasgow to build what was to be their newest flagship. Credited with the design of the ship was Blue Anchor's managing director and son of the owner, Frederick William "Willie" Lund. However, Lund was not a naval architect and his design consisted of little more than taking the blueprints of the fleet's current flagship, Geelong, and making alterations. These intended modifications would make the new ship slightly larger than Geelong but substantially heavier and thus more costly, with a contracted pricetag of £139,900. Designated Yard No. 472, the ship was laid down at Barclay Curle's Clydeholm Yard in Whiteinch.

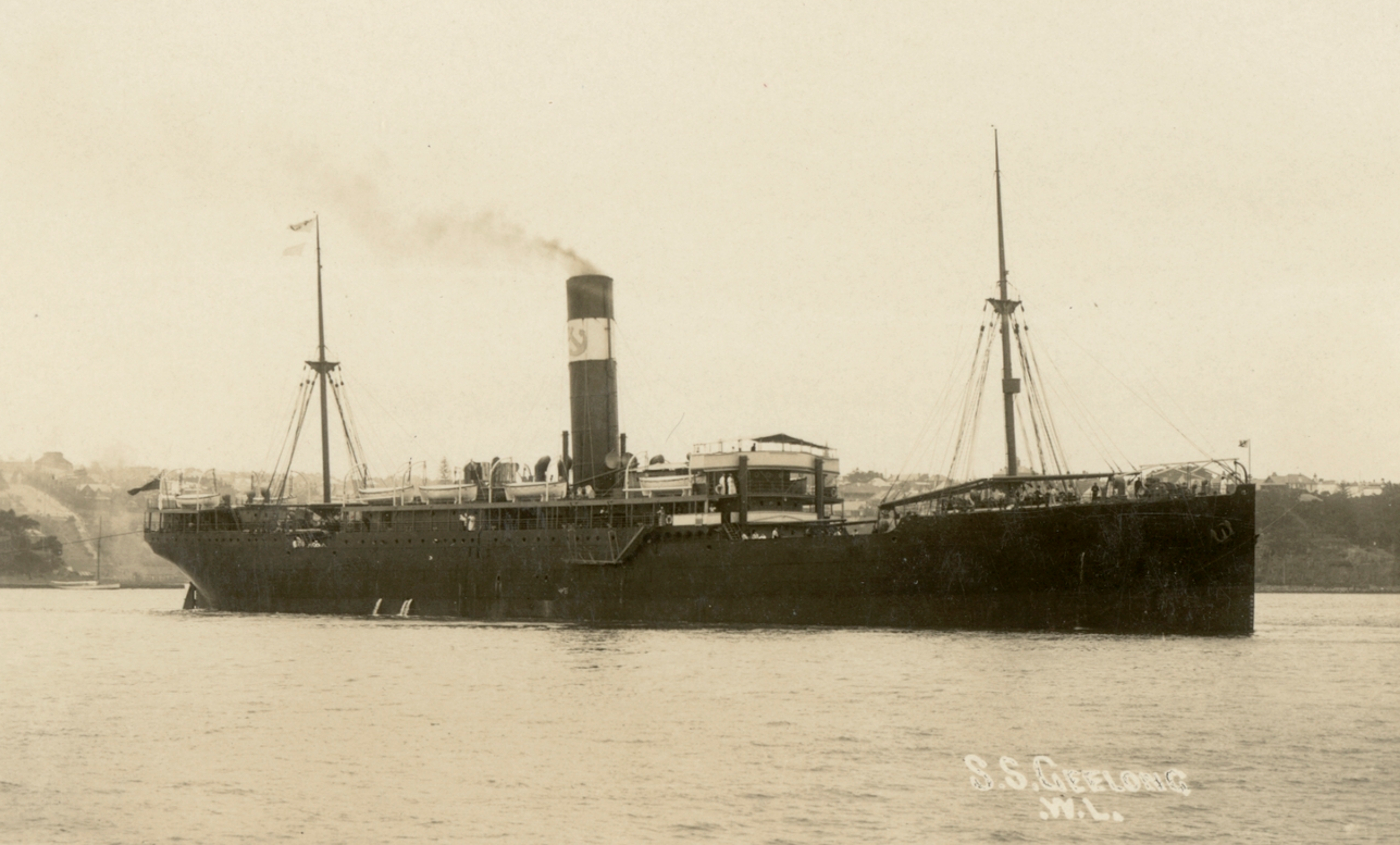
Geelong.

The vessel was specifically designed to capitalize on the booming immigration trade of working-class British people relocating to Australia. To meet the rising demand for low-cost passage to the Commonwealth, Lund proposed installing temporary dorms into the cargo holds, which when fully booked could accommodate an additional 500 third-class passengers. Then, upon reaching Sydney, the dorms would be dismantled and the holds converted back to cargo space for the thousands of tons of Australian wool and timber bound for overseas markets. Though innovative, this hybrid configuration necessitated a redistribution of weight throughout the ship (including the placement of her coal bunkers) and presented varying challenges to the ship's initial stability. With little grasp of the complexities inherent in his amalgamated design, Willie Lund also insisted that the new liner be "more stable than Geelong" while being able to shift in dock while carrying only water ballast and permanent coal. Though he tried to explain that these conditions were diametrically opposed, Noel Peck, managing director of Barclay Curle, offered a half-hearted placation to the junior partner by inserting the phrase "if possible" into the language of the contract. In the end, the architects at Barclay Curle assured the Lunds that a single stabililty curve plan would be sufficient for the loading, balancing and operation of the ship in either configuration. Lund's vacillations and the semantic arguments over the "if possible" condition dragged out construction and pushed delivery back by 38 days until late October. Per the terms of the contract, this delay entitled Blue Anchor to a demurrage of £50 per day for a total late fee of £1,900.

The liner was finally launched on 12 September 1908, with Elizabeth Ann Taverner, wife of Agent-General of Victoria John Taverner, serving as sponsor. William Lund had chosen to name his new flagship after the emblem flower of New South Wales, Australia; the chrysanthemum-like bloom Telopea speciosissim, also known by the Eora Aboriginal name Waratah.

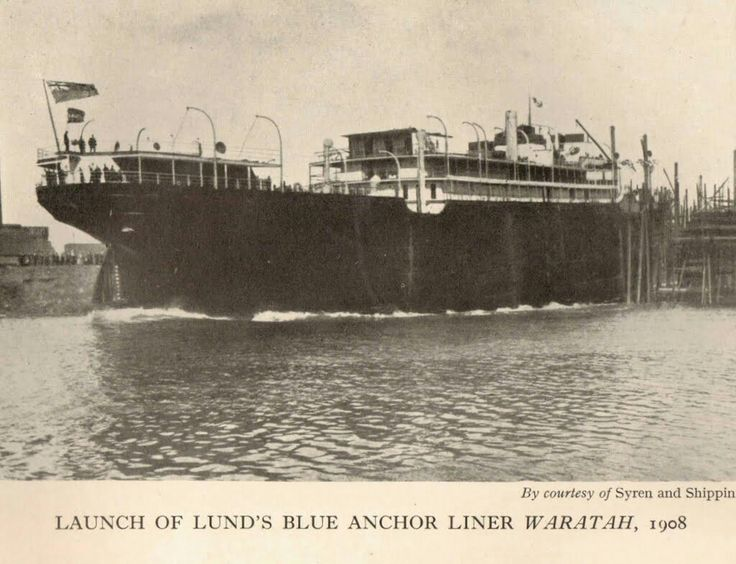
Waratah being launched, 12 September 1908

Waratah was 465 feet (142 m) long between perpendiculars, 59 feet 4 inches (18.08 m) across her beam, with a mean draft of 30 feet 4 1/2 inches (9.26 m). Her tonnages were 9,339 GRT, 6,004 NRT, and about 10,000 DWT. The vessel had a steel hull and was equipped with a pair of quadruple expansion engines, the cylinders of which measured 23 inches (58.4 cm), 32.5 inches (83 cm), 46.5 inches (118 cm) and 67 inched (170 cm) with a 48-inch (120 cm) stroke. Combined, the engines produced 1,003 nhp to drive her twin propellers which gave the ship a top rated speed of 13 1/2 knots (15.5 mph; 25.0 km/h). Waratah had a cellular double bottom built along her entire length which included twin bilge keels to improve the ship's rolling. The hull itself was divided into seven watertight compartments. These protective measures led some newspaper pundits to proclaim Waratah "practically immune from any danger of sinking".

But what set Waratah apart from other steamships of her time was her vaunted superstructure which extended four decks above the waterline. These included a spar deck, bridge deck including poop and forecastle, promenade deck and boat deck. First-class accommodations were housed on the promenade and bridge decks with capacity for 128 passengers, while third-class berths were located on the poop deck and in the upper tween decks and could house 160 third-class travelers. When including the crew compliment of 144, Waratah's passenger certificate permitted her to carry a total of 432 people. A nursery provided daycare facilities for the first-class passengers, a novelty on passenger ships of the day, with dining saloons and lounges strictly segregated based on class. She was also fitted with Kirkcaldy's distilling apparatus, capable of producing 5,500 imp gal (25,000 litres) of fresh water a day for drinking water and for use in the boilers. However, Waratah was not equipped with a wireless telegraph (known as a Marconi in honor of its inventor), which was still in the developmental stages at that time.

After her final fitting out, Waratah's sea trials were held on 23 October 1908 – the same day as she was set to be handed over to Blue Anchor. The tests were conducted on the Firth of Clyde, during which Waratah was able to successfully maintain a mean speed of 15 knots (17 mph; 28 km/h) over several runs on the measured mile. After successful completion of sea trials, the steamship was handed over to her owners and immediately departed for London.

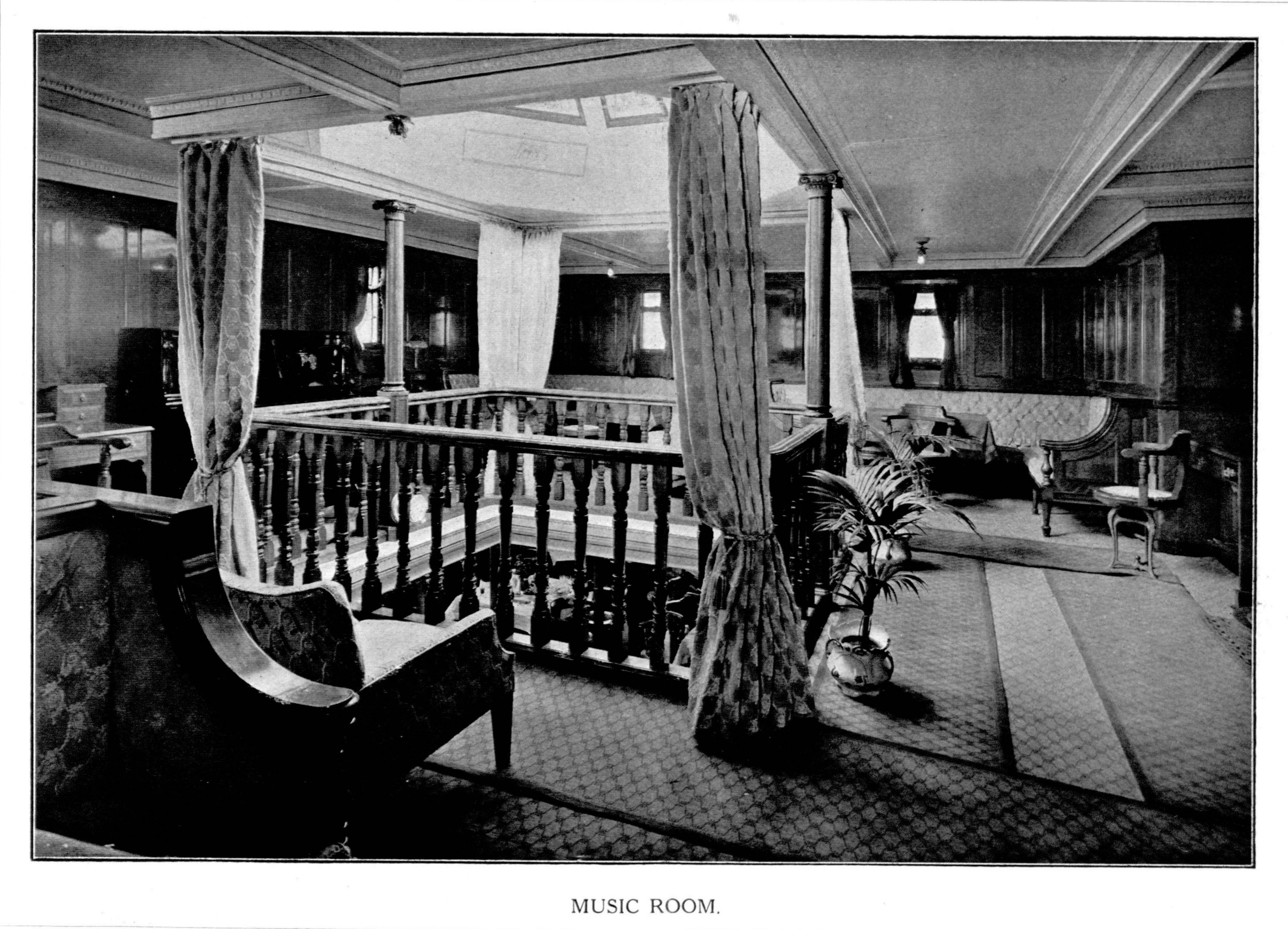
Music room on Waratah

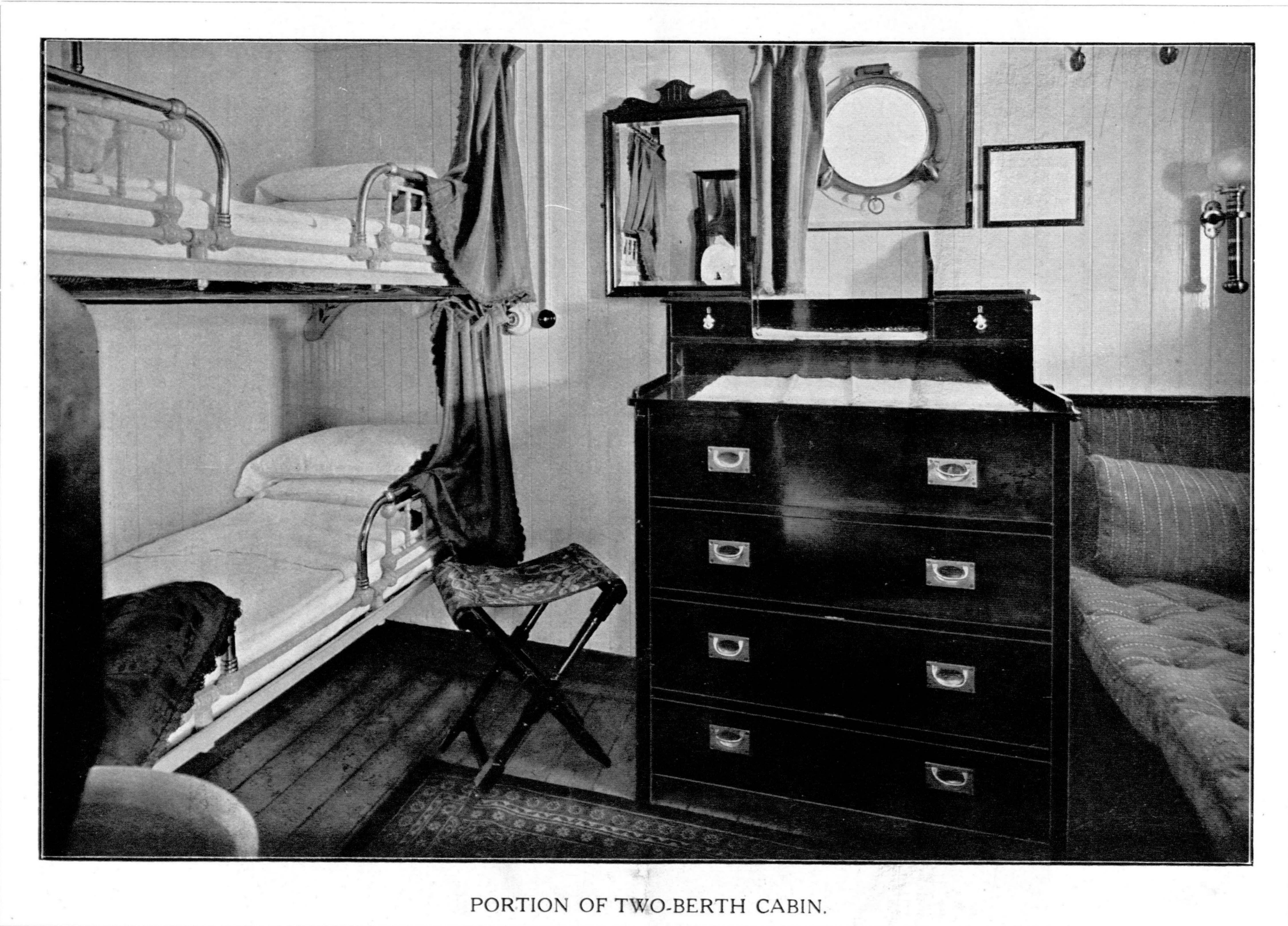
First-class cabin

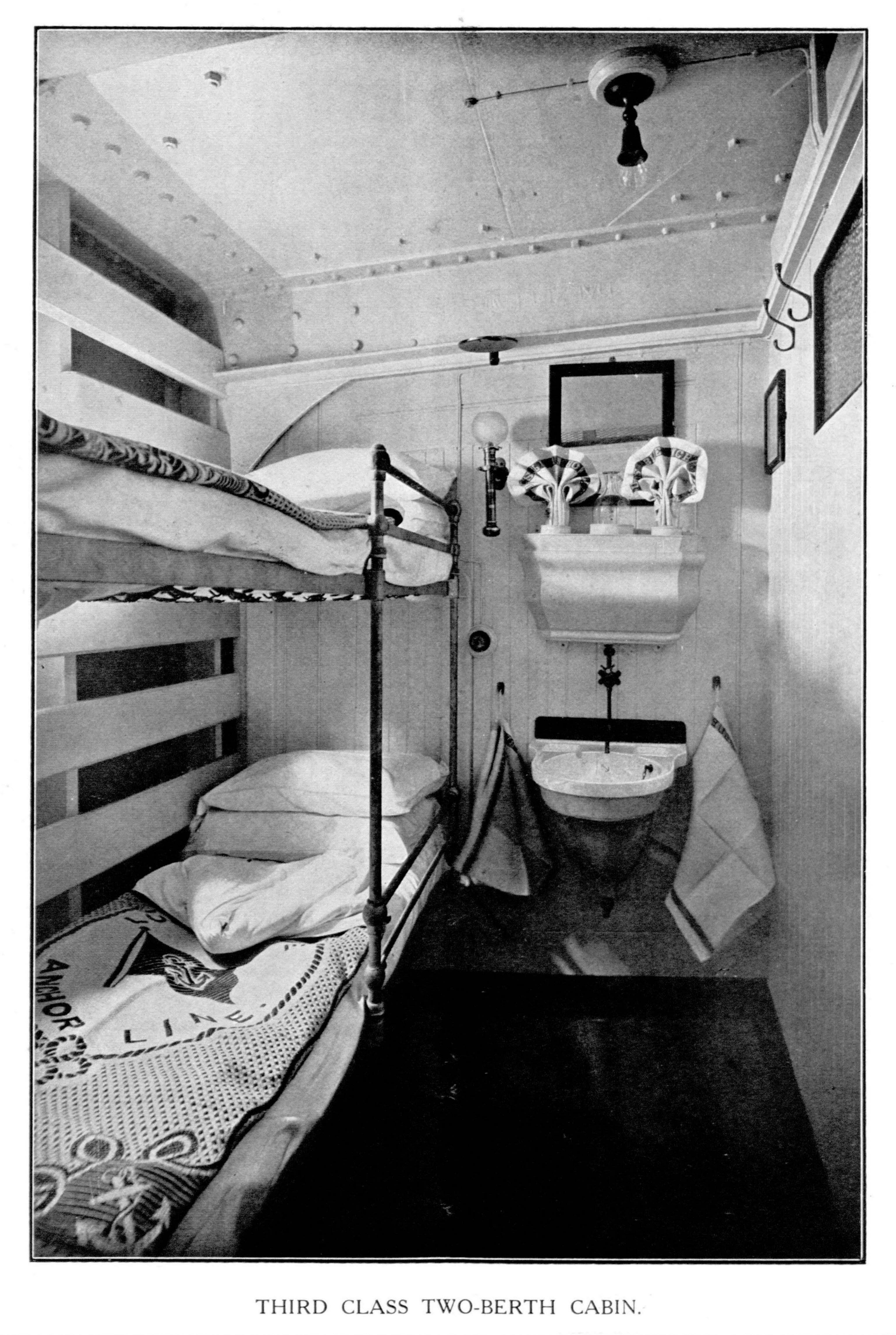
Third-class cabin

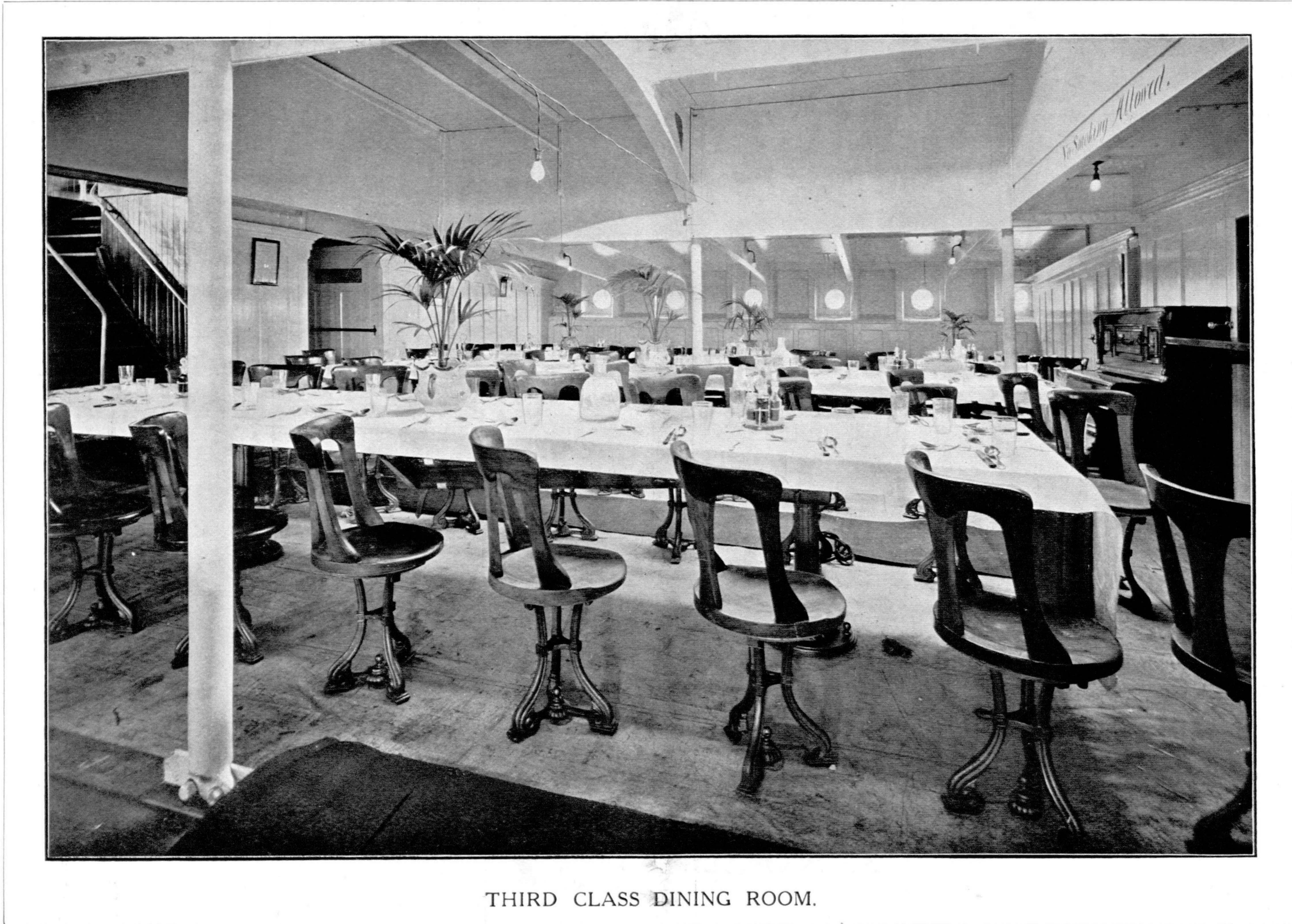
Third-class dining room

== Service history ==
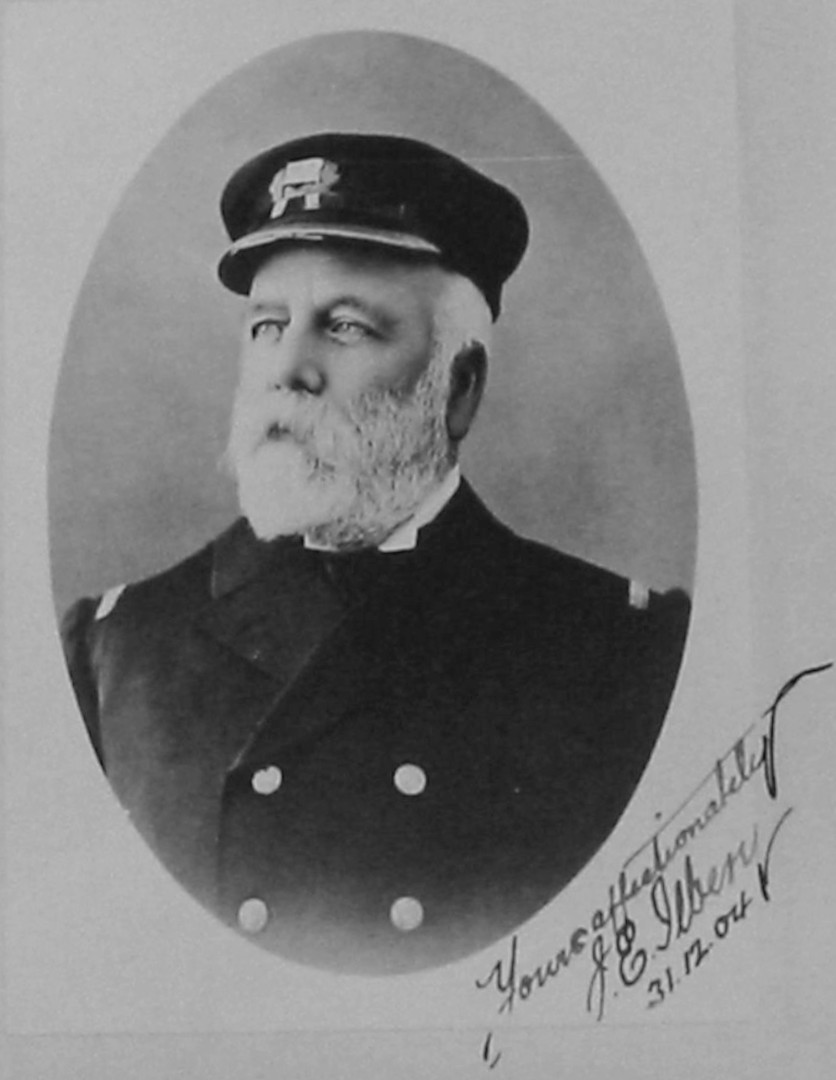
Josiah Edward Ilbery, captain of Waratah

Following delivery, Waratah left London for her maiden voyage on 5 November 1908, with 67 first-class passengers, 689 in third class, and a crew of 154. She was under the command of Captain Josiah Edward Ilbery, Commodore of the Blue Anchor Line and former master of Geelong who had more than 40 years of blue-water experience in both sailing vessels and steamships. After a brief stopover in Cape Town on 27 November, she departed for Australia where she reached Adelaide on 15 December 1908. Among her passengers were Hamilton Wickes, a newly appointed British Trade Commissioner for the Commonwealth; Dr. Ernest Anderson, Bishop of Riverina; and Octavius Beale, president of the Federal Council of Chambers of Manufactures.

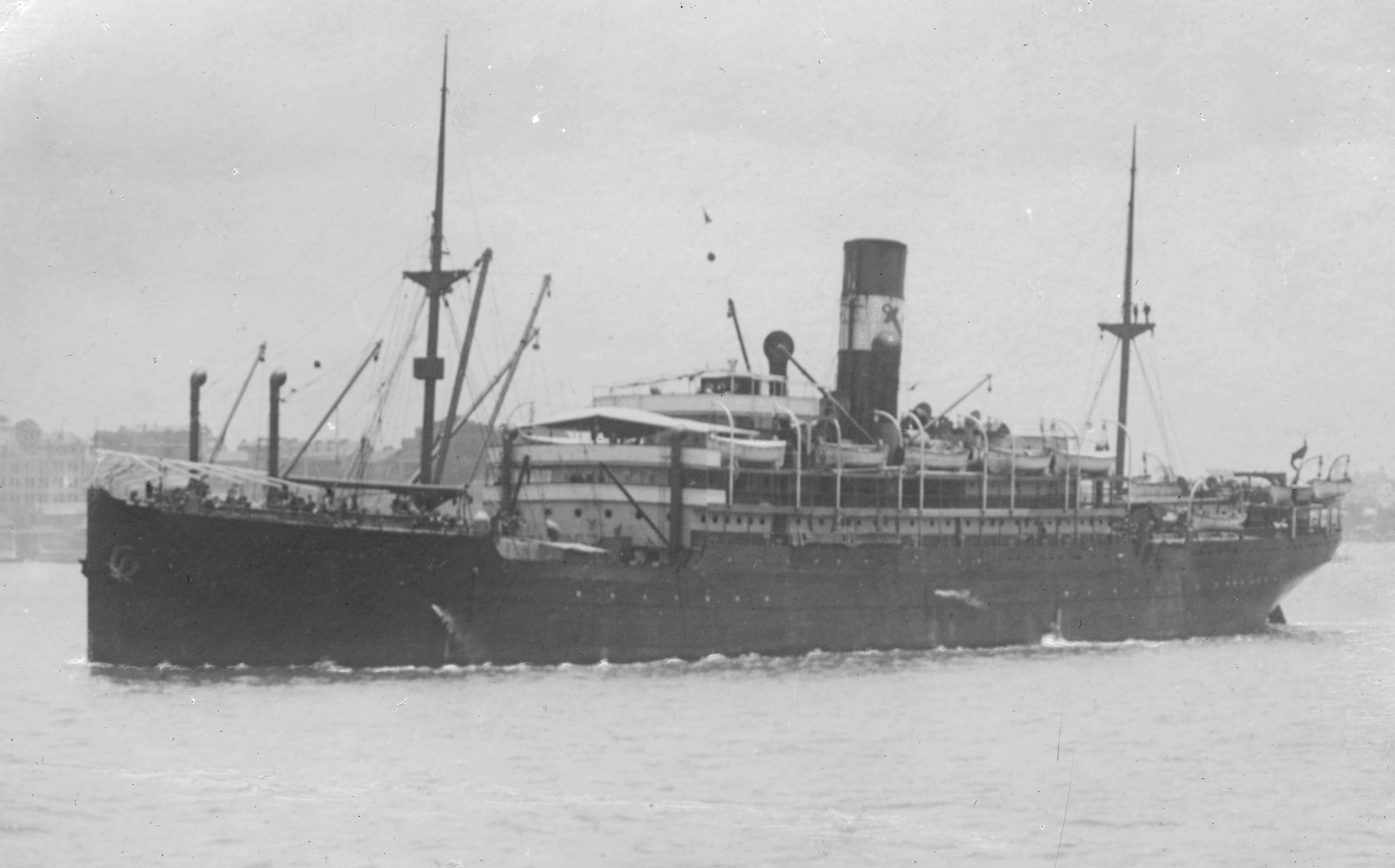
Waratah between April and July 1909 at an unknown location

While on her maiden voyage, early in the morning of 6 December 1908, a fire was discovered in the starboard aft tween decks bunker. While assessing the extent of the blaze, First Officer Charles Owen and Chief Engineer George Hodder were overcome by smoke inhalation and were incapacitated for two days. Though the fire never extended beyond the affected bunker, it continued reigniting until it was finally brought under control on 9 December. The fire was apparently caused by the heat emitted by several reducing and steam valves located on the starboard side of the engine room. While the roof of the engine room was insulated, the starboard side evidently was not. The repairs were performed at Sydney to the chief engineer's satisfaction.

From Adelaide, Waratah proceeded to Melbourne and Sydney, and sailed for London on 9 January 1909 via Durban and Cape Town. She arrived back in London on 7 March 1909. Upon returning to London, word spread that Captain Ilbery was not completely satisfied with his new ship and reported to the owners that despite the builders' assurances Waratah did not have the same stability as his former vessel, Geelong. After inbound passengers departed the ship in Tilbury, Waratah was taken upriver to the Royal Albert dock, where her cargo was unloaded and the ship was prepared for drydock. Conflicting accounts suggested that much of this down time was to effect some "structural modifications" to the ship, though what these were wasn't made public. However, due to limited space, the crew was forced to wait two weeks until an available drydock slip became available. This delay cut the overhaul window in half, leaving only enough time for recalking of the decks and repainting of the hull, which was done by the repair firm of R. & H. Green and Silley Weir. After her overhaul, the ship was inspected and again passed for passenger service.

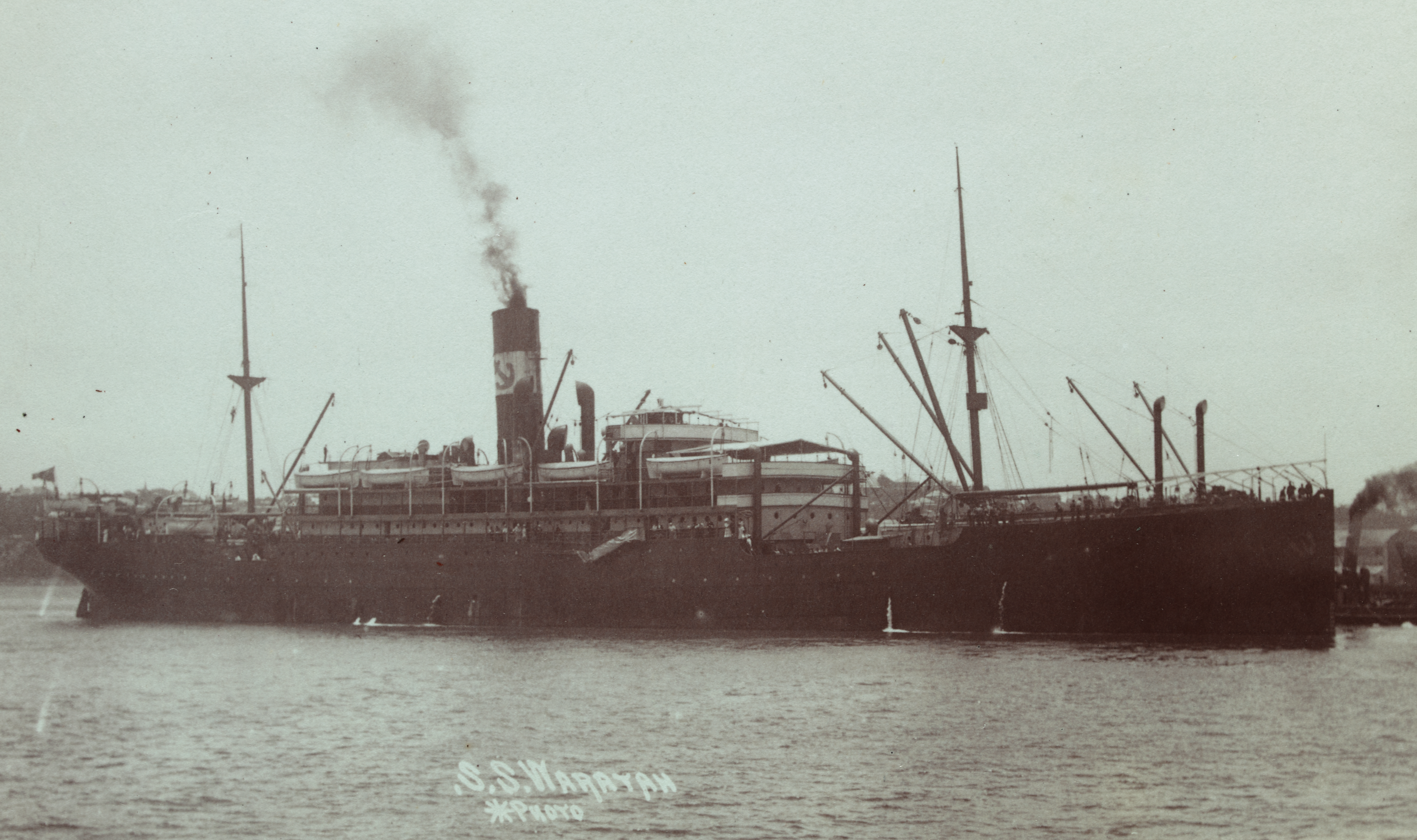
Waratah at Sydney in either 1908 or 1909

On 27 April 1909, Waratah set out on her second trip to Australia with a crew of 119 and 215 passengers; 22 in first class and 193 third – a precipitous drop from her maiden voyage. The outward trip was largely uneventful, and the ship arrived at Adelaide on 6 June after touching off at Cape Town on 18 May. Upon arriving in Adelaide, 1,000 tons of lead concentrates bound for Europe were loaded in the lower cargo holds to improve stability for the out-and-back to Melbourne and Sydney. When tugs attempted to draw the ship into harbor at her next stop in Williamstown, Waratah's elevated superstructure caught the wind like a sail, snapped towing hawsers and turned what should have been a routine operation into a four-hour ordeal. She then continued on to Sydney where she took on cargo for the return voyage including 7,800 bars of lead bullion weighing in at 395 tons. Waratah departed Sydney on 26 June 1909 for her return trip to London via the Cape of Good Hope. She again made intermediate stops in Melbourne and Adelaide to take on additional coal and cargo, including a second shipment of lead concentrates which when added to the previous lot brought the total weight of the powdered metal to more than 1,500 tons. The liner then set out for her two-week crossing of the Indian Ocean to Durban on 7 July. One of the third-class passengers during the leg to South Africa was a minor celebrity. John "Mad Jack" McLaughlin, a one-armed career criminal, was being extradited to Johannesburg via Durban to stand trial on two counts of murder. While on board Waratah, McLaughlin was guarded round the clock by two Transvaal policemen.

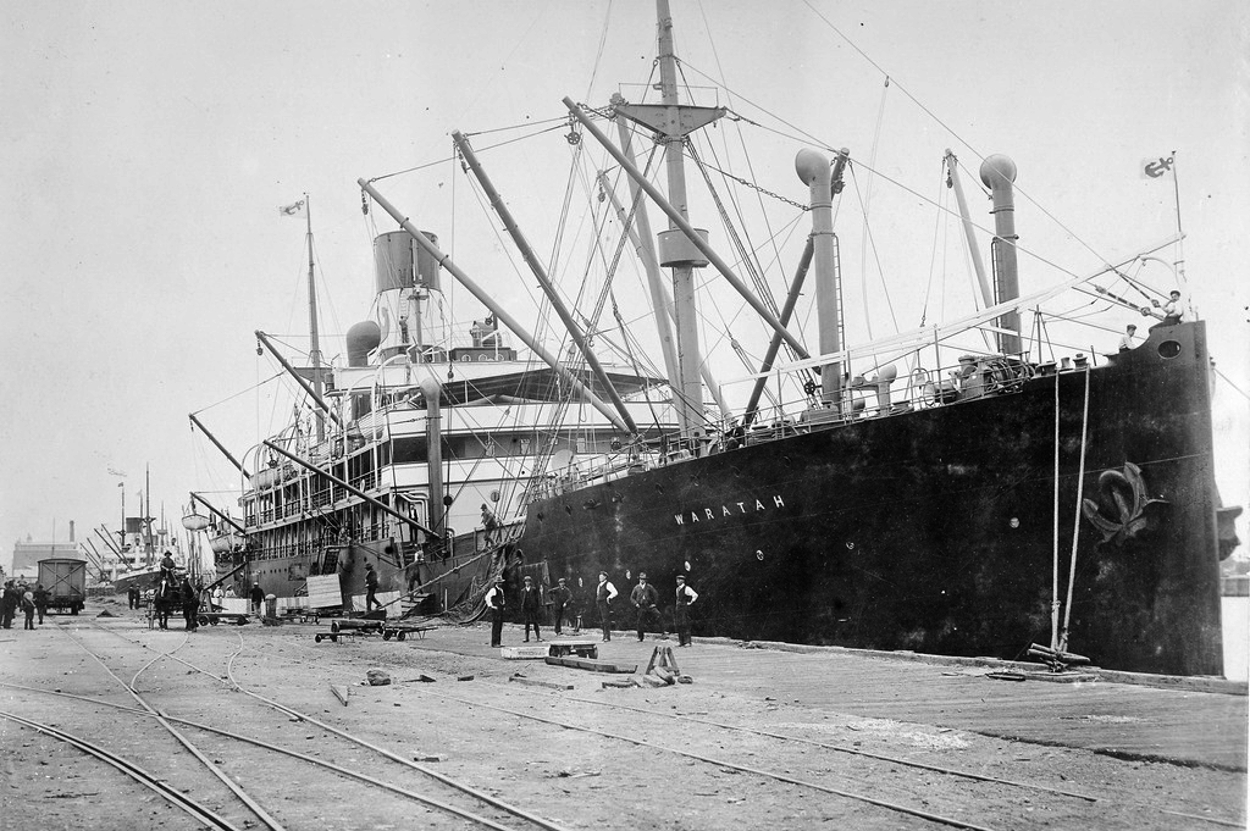
Waratah at Port Adelaide just before her last voyage.

Waratah reached Durban at 11:00 AM on 25 July where 30 passengers disembarked. One of these was Claude Gustav Sawyer, a businessman and an experienced sea traveller who was booked through to Cape Town, yet left the ship when she arrived in Port Natal. Popular myth has it that Sawyer raced off the ship, went straight to the telegraph office to cable his wife, then booked the next ship to Cape Town that wasn't Waratah. However, this legend does not align with the facts. In truth, after departing Waratah Sawyer remained in Durban for over a week before continuing on to Cape Town aboard the Union Castle Line ship Kildonan Castle, which departed Durban on 2 August and arrived in Table Bay on 4 August. It was only upon Sawyer's arrival in Cape Town that he sent his now famous telegram to his wife Emily which read, "Booked Cape Town, Thought Waratah Top-Heavy, Landed Durban, Claude." He then remained in Cape Town for almost two weeks before finally boarding the Union Castle steamer Galician on 16 August for his return trip to London. While awaiting his return to London, Sawyer gave an interview to a Cape Times reporter in which he stated that he disembarked from Waratah early in Durban because he had become nervous about the liner's behaviour and feared she was not seaworthy. Four months later Claude Sawyer's story would take a dramatic and eerie turn. In an article dated 22 January 1910 which appeared in the London weekly tabloid John Bull, Sawyer now claimed he left Waratah pre-emptively due to a series of dreams or visions in which a spectral figure appeared in his cabin holding a long sword in his left hand and a blood-soaked rag in the other. According to Sawyer's new narrative, this vision appeared to him three times at around three in the morning three days before the ship reached Durban which he took as an omen and it was for this reason he left the ship when Waratah reached port.

== Disappearance ==
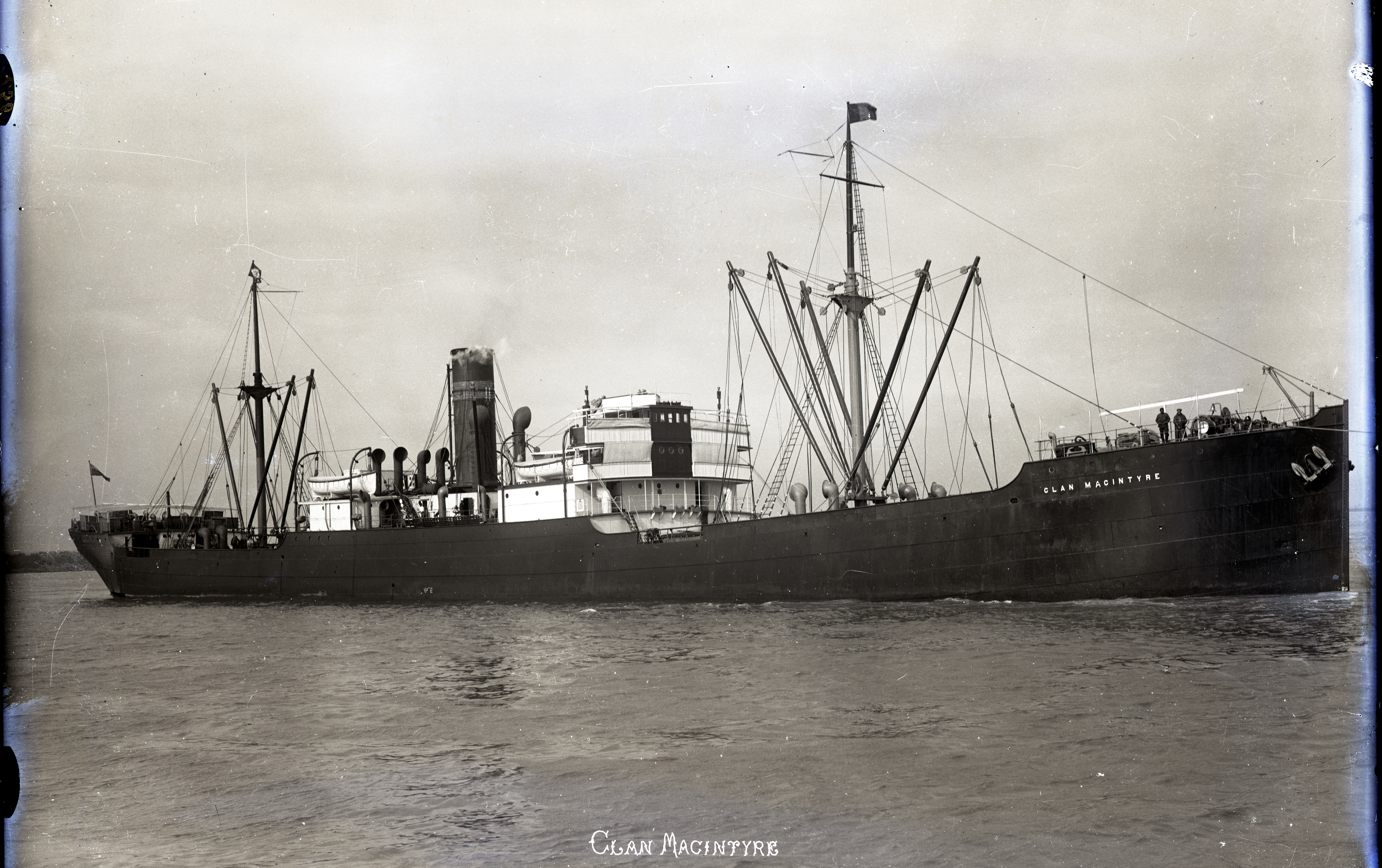
Clan MacIntyre

Waratah departed Durban at 8:15 PM on 26 July with 211 passengers and crew aboard for the trip to Cape Town. The following morning at 4:00 AM, the crew of the Clan Line cargo carrier Clan MacIntyre spotted a ship coming up fast on her stern at a point 10 miles off Cape Hermes. The large steamer quickly overtook the slower freighter as the ships neared Port St. Johns, at which point the Scots could see the blue anchor painted on the other ship's smokestack and identified her as Waratah. As they came abeam of one another the crews exchanged pleasantries via signal lamp. The conversation was recorded in the freighter's logbook.

Clan MacIntyre: “What ship?”

Waratah: “Waratah for London."

Clan MacIntyre: "Clan Macintyre for London. What weather had you from Australia?”

Waratah: “Strong S. W. and southerly wind across."

Clan MacIntyre: “Thanks, good-bye, pleasant voyage.”

Waratah: "Thanks, same to you, good-bye.”

Traveling at 16 knots with the aid of the Agulhas Current, Waratah soon left Clan MacIntyre in her wake as the ships continued to the southwest. Waratah remained in sight of the Scottish freighter for three more hours, gradually opening the distance until she disappeared over the horizon at 09:30 at 31° 21' South, 29° 3' East or 10 miles abeam of the Mbashe River delta. That was to be the last confirmed sighting of Waratah. As the day progressed the weather worsened, which by the predawn hours the following day had grown into a full-fledged cyclone. When later speaking about the storm, both Captain Alexander Weir and Chief Mate George Phillips of Clan MacIntyre said it was the worst they had experienced along the Cape in their combined 30 years of experience.

Two other ships reported seeing a ship that might have been Waratah shortly after she left Durban. At around 5:30 PM on the 27th, Captain Albert John Bruce of the tramp freighter Harlow saw smoke on the horizon astern at a distance he estimated to be 15 miles. After nightfall, Bruce spotted a light five to six miles astern which he believed to be a ship coming up behind him along the coast. Just before 8:00 PM as he was making his way from the chartroom back to the bridge, Bruce saw two long thin flashes of light rising into the sky in the direction of the light. Upon reaching the wheelhouse, the captain conferred with Chief Mate Robert Parkin Ovens and Chief Engineer Alfred Ernest Harris, who had also seen the flashes, and the men came to the consensus that these were nothing more than flareups from the numerous brushfires in the hills along the coastline – a common sight at that time of year. Nothing more was thought of the incident and the captain neither entered it into the log or reported it to authorities upon arriving into Durban the following day. However, upon arriving at Cavite in the Philippines two months later, and learning that Waratah was missing, Captain Bruce rationalized that the light he saw was a ship on fire and that the flashes must have been explosions which had destroyed the ship. Considering when and where the sighting took place, Bruce became convinced that what he and his men had believed to be brush flares were in fact the death throes of Waratah.

The Union Castle liner Guelph.

That same evening at around 9:50 PM, the Union-Castle Liner Guelph was steaming northeast toward Durban while eight miles offshore of East London. On the bridge were 4th Mate Thomas Blanchard and Captain James Culverwell, who spotted the lights of a steamer at a distance of five miles headed in the opposite direction. Blanchard attempted to signal the ship via the lamp as the ships passed one another's starboard beam, but in spite of the fair weather the distance made reading the exchange difficult. Though the vessels were within sight of one another for more than 10 minutes, the only portion of the signal Blanchard was able to make out were the last three letters: "T A H."

Another possible sighting which was not mentioned at the inquiry was that of Edward Joe Conquer, who in 1909 was an enlisted signalman for the Cape Mounted Rifles. On 28 July 1909, Conquer's unit was engaged in a training exercise on a hill overlooking the Xhora River mouth, but the weather was so poor that the soldiers had to retreat into their tents. While playing cards and waiting for the skies to clear, Conquer looked out through the opening of his tent and spotted a large steamer struggling against the storm and moving slowly toward the northwest. The signalman pointed this out to his tentmate, a fellow signalman named H. Adshead, and the pair watched the ship, which they estimated to be between four and five miles away. According to Conquer, when he later looked for the ship again, she was nowhere to be seen. However, Joe Conquer didn't come forward with his story until 20 years after Waratah was lost. He first told his tale to writer Lawrence G. Green, who included the story in his 1960 book Eight Bells at Salamander. Yet, in later versions of the story, Conquer claimed to have actually seen the ship overwhelmed by a wave and capsize within sight of shore. Though he claimed that he reported his sighting to his superiors both verbally and in a written statement, no evidence of either affidavit has ever been uncovered.

== Search ==
Waratah was scheduled to reach Cape Town on 29 July 1909. When she failed to arrive, no immediate alarm was raised as it was common for ships to arrive at port days or even weeks late due to weather or engine failure. Initially, her delay was attributed to a breakdown or mechanical fault, and that the liner was adrift south of the shipping lane atop the Agulhas Current. Fears began to grow for her safety when ships arriving at Cape Town reported having seen no sign of the overdue liner. The first search effort was launched on 31 July, when the tug Harry Escombe set out from Durban to retrace Waratah's assumed course to the west. The next day, the tugboat T. E. Fuller set out from Cape Town to search the Agulhas Banks, but turned into Mossel Bay four days later after encountering rough weather and without finding any trace of the ship. T. E. Fuller would later take part in the continuing search efforts along the coast. Next the Royal Navy sent the cruisers HMS Pandora, HMS Forte and HMS Hermes to search for the missing Waratah. During the almost three-week search Hermes encountered huge waves which warped her hull bracings and forced her into dry dock.

On 10 August 1909, a cable reached Adelaide reading "Blue Anchor vessel sighted a considerable distance out, slowly making for Durban, could be the Waratah." The Chair of the House of Representatives in the Australian Parliament halted proceedings to read out the message saying, "Mr. Speaker has just informed me that he has news on reliable authority that the SS Waratah has been sighted making slowly towards Durban." In Adelaide, mayor Frank Johnson ordered the town bells rung in celebration. However, the ship turned out not to be Waratah and passed Durban without stopping on Wednesday 11 August.

An overdue ship alert was issued to every ship crossing the Transkei coast instructing crews to keep a sharp lookout for Waratah. Numerous ships including Geelong and the German steamship Goslar watched in hopes of sighting the missing liner. Unfortunately, none did.

On 7 August the 1,510-ton Hong Kong Navigation Co. freighter Tinhow out of Glasgow arrived in East London, where the crew related a gruesome sighting. Captain Thomas Ramsey Kidd told port authorities that while steaming past the Mbashe River Delta he and his crew had spotted what they initially believed to be bodies floating in the water and altered their course to investigate. But upon closer inspection, Kidd determined that the “bodies” were whale carcasses – likely from the Durban Try Works – which were being followed along the current by a sizable flock of birds. About a week later upon arriving at Cape Town on 13 August 1909, Captain Walling Oscar Moore of the steamship Insizwa also reported seeing what he believed to be bodies floating just below the surface near the mouth of the Bashee (Mbashe) River. Second officer John Noble Day of the steamer Tottenham also claimed to have seen a body in the same general area. However, Captain Edward Cox and other members of Tottenham's crew stated that what they had seen were dead skate and whale carcasses. The tugs Buffalo and Harry Escombe were dispatched to the area to search for these supposed "bodies", finding instead only whale offal and dead skate, which the crew members stated bore an eerie resemblance to human bodies.

The New Zealand Steamship Company freighter Waikato.

Many held out hope that Waratah was still afloat and drifting, basing their belief on what had befallen the steamship Waikato in 1899. In June of that year, Waikato's propeller shaft snapped and could not be repaired at sea, leaving the ship to drift at the whims of the elements for over 100 days and covering a distance of over 2,500 nautical miles (4,600 km). Though she was sighted several times by other vessels, none was able to take her in tow until the steamer Asloun was finally able to secure a line to Waikato and tow her to Fremantle, Australia.

Waratah had enough provisions on board to last for a year but, because she lacked any radio equipment, she would have been unable to communicate with any ships beyond visual range. In September 1909, the Blue Anchor Line in conjunction with the Admiralty and the Australian government chartered the Union Castle cargo ship Sabine to search along the Waikato's drift course for Waratah. Sabine was fitted out with search lights and elevated crow's nests to aid in the search which operated round the clock. The search covered 14,000 nautical miles (26,000 km), and zig-zagged across the southern Indian Ocean for almost eight weeks without yielding any results. With no sighting of the ship for over four months, Waratah was officially posted as missing at Lloyd's of London on 15 December 1909. In early 1910, a group of Australian relatives of those lost aboard Waratah formed the Melbourne Search Committee and raised funds to outfit one final expedition to locate Waratah, which they believed was still drifting in the frigid southern waters. The newly built steamer Wakefield was chartered to conduct a four-month search, expanding the grid between the Sabine expedition limits and the Australian coast. Wakefield even landed crewmen on several of the uninhabited islands of the Kerguelen archipelago to search for castaways. Like previous efforts, the Wakefield foray proved unsuccessful.

No confirmed wreckage or bodies from Waratah have ever been found, although there were a number of unconfirmed reports. In March 1910, wreckage was said to have been found at Mossel Bay. A life buoy, reportedly marked with the name "Waratah", washed ashore in New Zealand in February 1912. In 1925, Lt. D. J. Roos of the South African Air Force reported that he had spotted a submerged wreck while flying a mail run over the Transkei coast. Though Roos professed that what he had seen was a shipwreck, neither he nor anyone else has ever seen the shipwreck again. Coincidentally, it was only after Roos met Joe Conquer in 1929 and the two compared stories about what each had seen near the Xhora River that the signalman came forward with his belated eyewitness account. Pieces of cork and timber were washed up near East London, South Africa in 1939 which some believed may have come from Waratah.

== Inquiry ==
The Board of Trade inquiry into the disappearance was held in December 1910 at Caxton Hall in London. It quickly came to focus on the supposed instability of Waratah. Evidence was greatly hampered by the lack of any survivors from the ship's final voyage (other than the small number, including Claude Sawyer, who had disembarked in Durban). Most evidence came from passengers and crew from Waratah's maiden voyage, her builders, and those who had handled her in port.

Expert witnesses tesfied that Waratah had been designed and built properly and sailed in good condition, citing her entry into the Lloyd's Register as proof of her seaworthiness. However, what the operators and builders glossed over was the fact that Waratah's designation of +100A1 as it appeared in the insurer's index was not a rating denoting a superior grade, but rather a classification based on her size, intended use and docking equipment. As for the "+" which many blieved to be an indication of an exemplary score, the symbol was in fact a Patee Cross (also known as a Maltese cross). In Lloyd's parlance the mark meant only that the ship had been built under special survey; as was the case for ships of a new class or those straddling differing classes which needed an exemption to be properly classified. In Waratah's case, both her hull and her machinery had been built under special survey. This exemption was an easy matter for Blue Anchor and Waratah as the co-chairman of the classification committee was none other than William Lund himself.

In correspondance submitted by Blue Anchor ownership, Captain Ilbery apparently made no mention of his new ship's peformace at all, focusing instead on the vessel's appearance and the passengers. The Lunds claimed that in personal conversations, the captain had only positive things to say about Waratah and mentioned nothing about behavioral issues. This led some to speculate that Ilbery may have had concerns about Waratah but deliberately kept such concerns quiet.

However, many witnesses who had travelled on the ship testified that Waratah felt unstable, frequently listed to one side even in calm conditions, rolled excessively, was very slow to come upright after leaning into a swell, and had a tendency for her bow to dip into oncoming waves rather than ride over them. One passenger on her maiden voyage said that when in the Southern Ocean she developed a list to starboard to such an extent that water would not run out of the baths and that she held this list for several hours before rolling upright and then settling down to a similar list on the other side. This passenger, physicist Professor William Bragg, concluded that the ship's metacentre was just below her centre of gravity. When slowly rolled over towards one side, she reached a point of equilibrium and would stay leaning over until a shift in the sea or wind pushed her upright.

Many former passengers and crew members corroborated Professor Bragg's contentions, while other claimed that Waratah exhibited a comfortable, easy roll. The ship's builders produced calculations to prove that even with a load of coal on her deck (that several witnesses claim she was carrying when she left Durban) she was not top heavy. These recalculated figures were drastically more favorable to the ship's performance than those the builders themselves had included with the ships initial stability curve and were only retabulated after Barclay Curle's management was called to testify at the inquiry.

As a mixed-use ship, Waratah was capable of transporting both passengers and cargo at the same time. Due to her large holds, she could carry a wide range of cargoes which complicated ballasting. During her final voyage, Waratah was loaded with 1,500 tons of lead concentrate in her lower cargo hold. Some speculated that if this powdered ore suddenly shifted, it might have destablized the ship causing it to capsize.

In the face of the contradictory evidence, the court was unable to come to a concensus as to what had led to Waratah's loss, stating in the final report that Waratah must have foundered after encountering "a storm of exceptional violence." The Board of Trade did not fault Barclay Curle or the Blue Anchor Line, but accuse the Lunds of shady busniess practices and of being less than truthful in their testimony.

== Aftermath ==
Efforts to have all passenger ships outfitted with wireless telegraphs had begun to gain traction even before Waratah's loss. On 24 January 1909, RMS Republic collided with the steamship Florida off Nantucket, Massachusetts in dense fog, and it was thanks to the former being equipped with a Marconi that rescuers were able to locate the stricken ships quickly and rescue the passengers and crew. This was the first time in history a Marconi was used at sea during a maritime emergency. Shortly after Waratah went missing, renewed calls for wireless transmitters being installed on all passenger ships reached the floor of the British Parliament. However, it would take the loss of Titanic three later years to spur authorities to act. In 1914, the International Convention for the Safety of Life at Sea (otherwise known as SOLAS) established wide-ranging protections for ships and those who sailed aboard them which included mandatory wireless telegraph systems.

== Theories ==
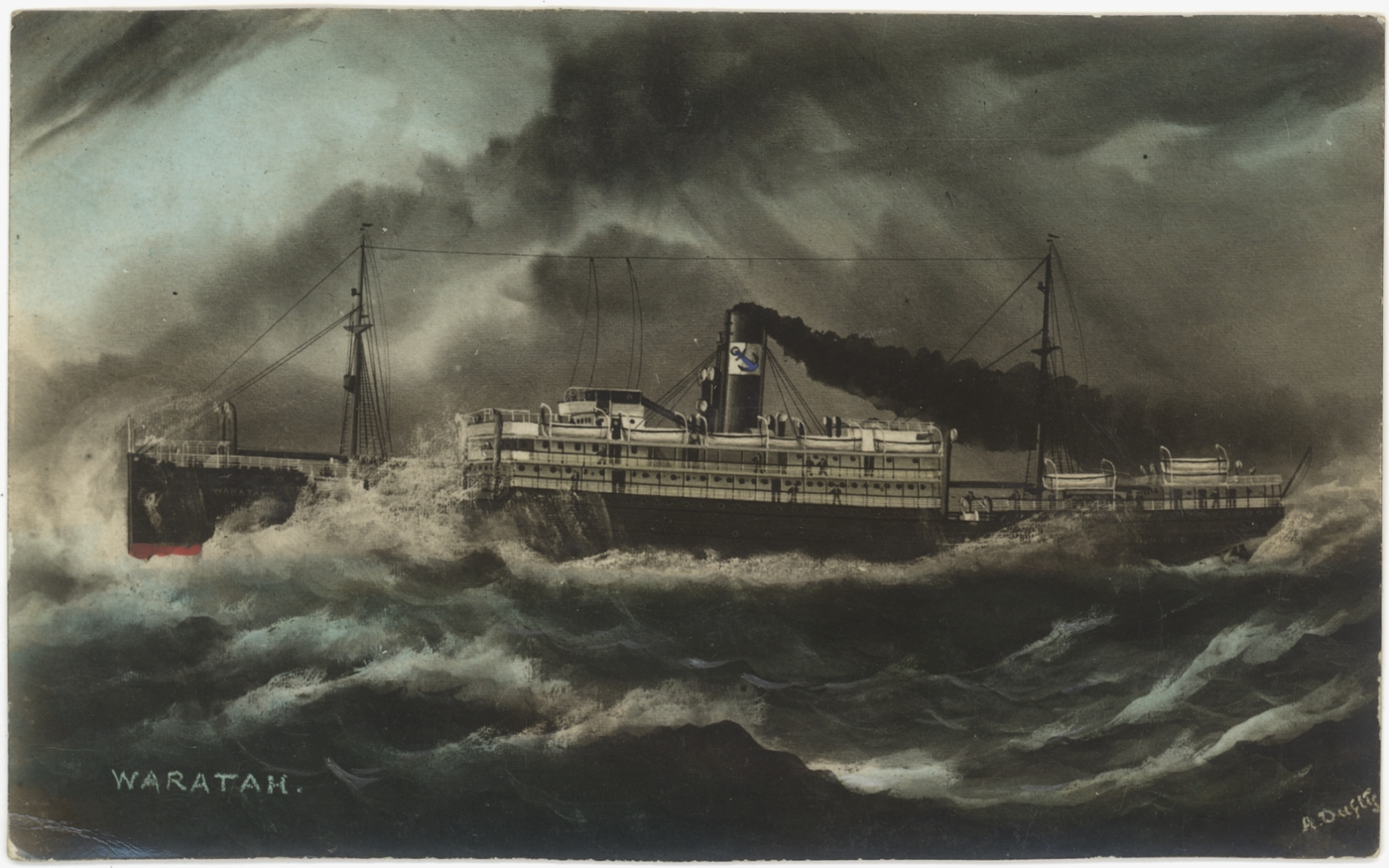
Artist's impression of Waratah at sea

=== Rogue Wave ===
One theory suggests that Waratah’s disappearance was the result of a rogue wave. These terrifying walls of water can appear suddenly and without warning even under normal sea conditions, catching unsuspecting crews off guard and inflicting severe or fatal damage to ships. A paper written by Professor Mallory of the University of Cape Town (1973) suggested that waves of up to 20 metres (66 feet) in height had been observed between Richards Bay and Cape Agulhas along the coast of South Africa. Still, such waves were thought to be myths until New Year's Day 1995 when an 84-foot monster wave struck the Draupner oil platform off the Norwegian coast. The fates of other lost ships have been attributed to rogue waves including Melanie Schulte (a German ship lost in the Atlantic Ocean) and MV Derbyshire (a British bulk carrier sunk in the Pacific Ocean). A 2025 paper by J. D. Pons in the Journal of Maritime Archaeology theorizes that Waratah may have fallen victim to a rogue wave in the vicinity of Algoa Bay.

=== Cargo shift ===
Waratah was carrying 1,500 tons of lead concentrates as part of her cargo. This dense, metallic powder is loaded in bulk and occupies 12 cubic feet per ton. During transport, agitation brought on by the ship's movement causes this metal powder to settle with water trapped between the particles being pressed out and rising to the surface. Once liquified, this mixture can slosh from one side of a ship's hold to the other in what is known as the free surface effect which may severely affect the vessel's righting moment, potentially causing her to capsize. Today, ore concentrates are treated as hazardous cargo with detailed requirements laid out for its transport. These precautions did not exist at the turn of the 20th century.

=== Whirlpool ===
One fanciful suggestion is that Waratah was caught in a whirlpool created by a combination of winds and currents along the precipitous continental shelf of the South African coastline. While vortices such as these might pose a hazard for smaller water craft, there has never been an instance where a large ship has been sunk due to a massive whirlpool.

=== Piracy ===
During her final voyage, Waratah was carrying more than 300 tons of metal ingots bound for London which many have believed was gold due to its listing in the manifest as "bullion". This mistaken belief has led some to theorise that pirates seized Waratah, stole the gold, murdered those on board and then scuttled the ship. But the word "bullion" does not mean gold, silver or any precious metal for that matter. The word is derived from the Latin "bullire" which means "to boil". Thus, bullion can be any non-ferrous metal refined through heating and melting into a more pure and transportable form. Had Waratah been carrying a load of gold, she would have been in no danger of skulduggery as there were no pirates operating along the South African coast at the time – thanks to omnipresent Royal Navy warships. And even had there been pirates intent on making away with a king's ransom in gold, they certainly would not have attacked a 465-foot ship from a rowboat at the height of a hurricane.

=== Explosion ===
Given the evidence from the officers of Harlow (see above), it has been speculated that Waratah was destroyed by a sudden coal dust explosion in one or more of her bunkers. Coal dust is highly combustible and even explosive when of sufficient saturation. However, at the time the crew of Harlow spotted the towers of flame, Waratah had been at sea for less than a day and would have burned through only about 100 tons of coal. Therefore, the bunkers would have been completely filled leaving no room for combustible clouds of coal dust to accumulate. And had the ship exploded less than two miles from Port St. Johns, the coastline for miles on either side of the river mouth would have been covered in debris and bodies.

=== The Waratah 'curse' ===
A popular myth has emerged in the wake of the disappearance which holds that every ship named Waratah suffered a tragic fate. And there were instances which seemed to support this contention. In March 1848, the 439-ton sailing barque Waratah en route from London for Sydney foundered just as she rounded the western coast of France near Ushant with the loss of 13 lives. In 1852 the 29-ton single-masted cutter Waratah out of Hobart ran aground on Roaring Beach, near the village of Nubeena on the Tasman Peninsula. The next instance occurred in 1864 when the 109-ton schooner Waratah sank near Newcastle Harbour while traveling to Sydney with a load of coal. The year 1887 was particularly unlucky for Waratahs when two vessels sporting that name were lost within four months of one another. The first was a North Shore Ferry Company steamer Waratah which collided with the Port Jackson Steamship Company ferry Emu in Sydney Harbour around midnight on 24 February. Luckily, there were no casualties and the vessel was raised a week later and sent to drydock for repairs. The second was a 425-ton steam collier hauling a load of coal bound for Bulli when she ran aground near the Illawarra Jetty on 6 June. The wreckage of this ship is still visible today at low tide. Two years later, the sailing pearler Waratah sank near Barrow Island off Cape Preston with the loss of all hands. In addition to these, there were other vessels named Waratah which sank or ran aground over the course of maritime history. However, the number of Waratahs meeting an untimely end are low when compared with supposed curses related to other ships' names. Records indicate that at least 23 ships named Sally have sunk over the course of maritime history. As have 41 Catherines, 60 Auroras, 94 Elizabeths, and 98 Marys. These numbers dwarf those of Waratah, yet these coincidental founderings are not thought to be the result of any curse, but the unfortunate few of the dozens if not hundreds of vessels which have shared the same name.

== Later searches ==
A number of later efforts to locate a wreck have taken place, in particular undertaken by Emlyn Brown who was convinced that the sighting of Edward Joe Conquer held the key to Waratah's whereabouts. Under Brown's leadership, expeditions to locate Waratah took place in 1983, 1989, 1991, 1995 and 1997. In 1999, there were newspaper reports that Waratah had been found 10 km (6 miles) off the eastern coast of South Africa. A sonar scan conducted by Emlyn Brown's team had indeed located a wreck, the outline of which seemed to match that of Waratah. In 2001, however, a dive at the site revealed that the wreck was that of Nailsea Meadow, a cargo ship that a German U-boat had sunk in the Second World War. In 2004, Emlyn Brown, who had by then spent 22 years looking for Waratah, declared that he was giving up the search: "I've exhausted all the options. I now have no idea where to look," he said.

In 2009, Brown gave his opinion that Waratah possibly capsized in the storm; in his view, the upturned ship may have remained afloat for long enough to be carried south by currents, before finally sinking into the deep ocean beyond the continental shelf where it cannot be easily located.

== Memorials ==
A memorial to Thomas Newman, a victim of the sinking, in Higher Cemetery, Exeter

A plaque in the Parish Church at Buckland Filleigh, Devon, England, commemorates Col. Percival John Browne. He was returning to England on Waratah, from his sheep farm in Mount Gambier, South Australia. His family home was Buckland House.

A plaque to the memory of Howard Cecil Fulford, the ship's surgeon, was erected in the chapel by his fellow students at Trinity College (University of Melbourne).

In the Parish Church of St Wilfrid, Bognor Regis, England, is a plaque: "The church gates were given in memory of Harris Archibald Gibbs who was drowned at sea in the SS Waratah".

In the main church in Aberystwyth, Wales, is a plate "in happy memory of John Purton Morgan, 3rd Officer SS Waratah lost at sea 1909".

A memorial in Higher Cemetery, Exeter, Devon, commemorates Thomas Newman "drowned in SS Waratah 27th July 1909".

A centenary plaque was unveiled at the Queenscliffe Maritime Museum, Victoria, Australia, on 27 July 2009.

== Cultural impact ==
Waratah has often drawn comparisons to RMS Titanic; the White Star Line flagship which sank three years later on her maiden voyage with the loss of over 1,500 people. Consequently, Waratah has been referred to as the "Titanic of the Southern Seas", the "Titanic of the South" and "Australia's Titanic".

The 1971 novel Scend of the Sea by Geoffrey Jenkins includes a fictional account of the Waratah mystery.

Adventure writer Clive Cussler used Waratah's disappearance as the plot of his 2014 book Ghost Ship.

== See also ==
- List of people who disappeared mysteriously at sea
