= SS Clan Allan =

Cargo ship built in 1942

History

United Kingdom
- Name: Empire Forest (1942–46); Clan Allan (1946–58); Umtali (1958–59); Clan Allan (1959–1961); Ardsirod (1961–1966)
- Owner: Ministry of War Transport (1942–46); Clan Line (1946–58); Bullard, King & Co Ltd (1958–59); Clan Line (1959–61); Mullion & Co Ltd (1961–66)
- Operator: Smith, Hogg & Co Ltd (1942–46); Clan Line (1946–58); Bullard, King & Co Ltd (1958–59); Clan Line (1959–61); Mullion & Co Ltd (1961–66)
- Port of registry: South Shields, United Kingdom (1942–46); Glasgow, United Kingdom (1946–58); London, United Kingdom (1958–59); Glasgow, United Kingdom (1959–61); Hong Kong (1961–66)
- Builder: John Readhead & Sons Ltd
- Yard number: 526
- Launched: 15 January 1942
- Completed: March 1942
- Maiden voyage: 22 March 1942
- Out of service: 1966
- Identification: United Kingdom Official Number 168653 (1942–61); Code Letters BDFF (1945–46)
- Fate: Scrapped 1966

General characteristics
- Type: Cargo ship
- Tonnage: 7,043 GRT; 4,957 NRT
- Length: 430 ft 9 in (131.29 m) (LPP); 446 ft 6 in (136.09 m) (OL)
- Beam: 56 ft 2 in (17.12 m)
- Draught: 26 ft 6 in (8.08 m)
- Depth: 36 ft 2 in (11.02 m)
- Installed power: Triple expansion steam engine 510nhp
- Propulsion: Single screw propeller
- Speed: 11 knots (20 km/h)

Clan Allan was a 7,043 GRT cargo ship that was built in 1942 as Empire Forest by John Readhead & Sons Ltd, South Shields, County Durham, United Kingdom for the Ministry of War Transport (MoWT). She was sold to Clan Line in 1946 and renamed Clan Allan. Sold in 1958 to Bullard, King & Co Ltd and renamed Umtali, she was sold back to Clan Line the following year and renamed Clan Allan. She was sold to Mullion & Co Ltd, Hong Kong in 1961 and renamed Ardsirod, serving until 1966 when she was scrapped.

== Description ==
The ship was 430 ft 9 in (131.29 m) long between perpendiculars (446 ft 4 in (136.04 m) overall), with a beam of 56 feet 2 inches (17.12 m). She had a depth of 35 feet 2 inches (10.72 m) and a draught of 26 feet 9 inches (8.15 m). She was assessed at 7,043 GRT, 4,957 NRT.

The ship was propelled by a 510 nhp triple expansion steam engine, which had cylinders of 24 1/2 inches (62 cm), 39 inches (99 cm) and 70 inches (180 cm) diameter by 48 inches (120 cm) stroke. The engines were built by John Readhead & Sons Ltd. It drove a single screw propeller. The engine could propel the ship at a speed of 11 knots (20 km/h).

== History ==
The ship was built in 1942 by John Readhead and Sons Ltd, South Shields, County Durham as Empire Forest for the MoWT. She was yard number 526. She was launched on 13 January 1942 and completed in March. The United Kingdom Official Number 168653 and Code Letters BDFF were allocated. Her port of registry was South Shields.

Empire Forest was operated under the management of Smith, Hogg & Co Ltd. She departed from the River Tyne on her maiden voyage of 22 March 1942, to join Convoy FN 661, which had departed from Southend, Essex the previous day and arrived at Methil, Fife on 23 March. She then joined Convoy EN 63, which sailed the next day and arrived at Oban, Argyllshire on 27 March. She left the convoy at Loch Ewe. Empire Fores then joined Convoy ON 80, which departed from Liverpool, Lancashire on 27 March and arrived at Halifax, Nova Scotia, Canada on 15 April. She left the convoy off Halifax, sailing on to Saint John, New Brunswick, Canada, where she arrived on 17 April.

Empire Forest sailed from Saint John on 10 May for Cape Town, South Africa, where she arrived on 10 June. She departed nine days later for Durban, arriving on 22 June and sailing on 25 June for Lourenço Marques, Mozambique, which was reached on 27 June. She departed on 15 June for Bombay, India, where she arrived on 2 August. Empire Forest was a member of Convoy BP 54, which departed from Bombay on 6 September. She arrived at Basra, Iraq on 15 September sailing two days later for Um Qasr, which was reached later that day.

Empire Forest sailed from Um Qasr on 26 September for Karachi, India, where she arrived on 2 October. She sailed three days later for Bombay, arriving on 17 October. She departed on 20 October for Colombo, Ceylon, where she arrived on 25 October. Empire Forest sailed the next day for Visakhapatnam, India, from where she sailed on 1 November for Calcutta, arriving on 5 November. She sailed a week later for Madras, where she arrived on 20 November and departed four days later for Durban. She arrived on 16 December. Empire Forest was a member of Convoy DC 2, which departed from Durban on 23 December and arrived at Cape Town on 28 December.

Empire Forest then sailed to Recife, Brazil, from where she sailed on 20 January 1943 to join Convoy BT 1, which had departed from Bahia, Brazil on 18 January and arrived at Trinidad on 30 January. She then joined Convoy TAG 41, which sailed on 8 February and arrived at Guantanamo Bay, Cuba on 13 February. She then joined Convoy GN 41, which sailed that day and arrived at New York, United States on 21 February. Carrying general cargo, Empire Forest joined Convoy SC 121, which sailed on 23 February and arrived at Liverpool on 14 March.

Empire Forest sailed from Liverpool on 15 April with Convoy OS46KM, which split at sea on 24 April. She was carrying a cargo described as "stores". She was in the part of the convoy that formed Convoy KMS 13G and arrived at Gibraltar on 26 April. She then joined Convoy KMS 13, which sailed that day and arrived at Bône, Algeria on 29 April. She left the convoy and put into Philippeville, Algeria, where she arrived that day. Empire Forest sailed on 14 May to join Convoy MKS 13, which had departed from Bougie, Algeria that day and arrived at Gibraltar on 19 May. She sailed on 28 May to join Convoy OS 48, which formed at sea on 29 May and arrived at Freetown, Sierra Leone on 7 June. Empire Forest then joined Convoy ST 69, which sailed on 11 June and arrive at Takoradi, Gold Coast on 16 June. She sailed on 3 July with Convoy TS 46, which arrived at Freetown on 8 July. She was a member of Convoy SL 133, which departed on 13 July and rendezvoused at sea with Convoy MKS 18 on 18 July. The combined convoy arrived at Liverpool on 5 August. She left the convoy at Loch Ewe on 4 August to join Convoy WN 463, which sailed the next day and arrived at Methil on 6 August. She then joined Convoy FS 1188, which sailed the next day and arrived at Southend on 9 August. She left the convoy at Middlesbrough, Yorkshire, arriving on 8 August.

Empire Forest sailed from Middlesbrough on 14 August for Hull, Yorkshire, arriving the next day. She sailed on 30 October for the River Tyne, from where she departed on 2 November for Methil, arriving the next day. She then joined Convoy EN290, which sailed on 4 October and arrived at Loch Ewe two days later. She sailed on to Oban, arriving later that day. Empire Forest departed on 8 October to join Convoy OS56KM, which had sailed from Liverpool the day before and split at sea on 18 October. She was in the part of the convoy that formed Convoy KMS 29, which arrived at Gibraltar on 20 October. She then joined Convoy KMS 29, which sailed that day and arrived at Port Said, Egypt on 31 October.

Empire Forest sailed on 16 November for Alexandria, Egypt, arriving the next day. She sailed on 23 November join Convoy MKS 32, which had departed from Alexandria the previous day and arrived at Gibraltar on 3 December. She left the convoy at Augusta, Sicily, Italy on 28 November. She sailed the next day with Convoy AH 10A, which had Bari as its destination. She left the convoy at Taranto, arriving on 30 November. Empire Forest sailed on 14 December to join Convoy HA 12, which had departed from Bari that day and arrived at Augusta on 16 December. She sailed on 25 December to join Convoy UGS 26, which had departed from the Hampton Roads, Virginia, United States on 5 December and arrived at Alexandria on 30 December.

Empire Forest sailed from Alexandria on 31 January 1944 to join Convoy MKS 39, which had departed from Port Said the previous day and arrived at Gibraltar on 11 February. She sailed that day with Convoy MKS39G, which rendezvoused at sea with Convoy SL 148 on 12 February. Her cargo was listed as armoured fighting vehicles and cotton. The combined convoy arrived at Liverpool on 24 February.

Carrying general cargo, Empire Forest sailed on 3 April with Convoy OS73KM, which split at sea on 16 April. She was in the part of the convoy which formed Convoy KMS 47G and arrived at Gibraltar on 17 April. She sailed on 5 May to join Convoy GUS 38, which had departed from Port Said on 24 April and arrived at the Hampton Roads on 22 May. She left the convoy and put into New York, arriving on 21 May. Carrying general cargo and explosives, Empire Forest sailed with Convoy HX 295 on 10 June. It arrived at Liverpool on 24 June. She left the convoy at Loch Ewe, and sailed on 26 June with Convoy WN 600, which arrived at Methil on 28 June. She sailed the next day with Convoy FS 1498, which arrived at Southend on 1 July. She left the convoy at Middlesbrough, arriving on 30 June.

Empire Forest sailed on 24 July to join Convoy FS 1523, which had departed from Methil that day and arrived at Southend on 26 July. During August and into September, she sailed between Southend and the Seine Bay in various ET and FT convoys. She departed from the Seine Bay on 11 September with Convoy FTM 2A, which arrived at Southend the next day. She left the convoy at the Solent and then sailed to Spithead to join Convoy FBC 79, which had departed from the Seine Bay on 11 September and arrived at the Bristol Channel on 13 September. She arrived at Milford Haven, Pembrokeshire the next day, sailing the day after for Liverpool, where she arrived on 16 September.

Empire Forest departed from Liverpool on 24 September with Convoy OS90KM, which split at sea on 1 October. She was in the part of the Convoy that formed Convoy KMS64G and arrived at Gibraltar on 2 October. She then joined Convoy KMS 64, which sailed that day and arrived at Port Said on 12 October. Her destination was Augusta, where she arrived on 8 October. She departed the next day with Convoy AH 72, which arrived at Brindisi, Italy on 11 October. She left the convoy at Bari, arriving that day. Empire Forest sailed with Convoy HA 73 on 16 October and arrived at Augusta two days later. She sailed on 21 October to join Convoy MKS 64, which had departed from Port Said on 16 October and arrived at Gibraltar on 28 October. She sailed on 1 November with Convoy OS 93, which dispersed in the Atlantic Ocean at 32°55′N 10°07′W the next day. She arrived at Freetown on 10 November. Empire Forest departed from Freetown on 16 November and arrived back there on 9 December. She sailed two days later for Gibraltar, arriving on 21 December. Carrying a cargo of coffee, She sailed that day with Convoy MKS 72G, which arrived at Liverpool on 30 December. Her destination was Southampton, where she arrived that day.

Empire Forest sailed from Southampton on 10 January 1945 to join Convoy TBC 34, which had departed from Southend that day and arrived at Milford Haven on 13 January. She left the convoy at Plymouth, Devon on 12 January and joined Convoy COC 49, which sailed the next day and arrived at Granville, Manche, France on 14 January. Her destination was Morlaix, Finistère, France, where she arrived that day. Empire Forest sailed on 27 January for Fowey, Cornwall, arriving the next day. She sailed on 31 January for Falmouth, Cornwall, arriving later that day and sailing two days later to join Convoy TBC 55, which had departed from Southend on 31 January and arrived at Milford Haven on 3 February. She was the only ship in Convoy MH 13, which departed from Milford Haven that day and arrived at the Clyde on 5 February.

Empire Forest sailed on 3 March to join Convoy OS114KM, which had departed from Southend the previous day and split at sea on 7 March. She was in the part of the convoy that formed Convoy KMS 88 and arrived at Gibraltar on 11 March. she passed Gibraltar and sailed on to Port Said, where she arrived on 19 March. She then sailed to Suez, Egypt, from where she departed on 21 March for Aden, where she arrived on 27 March. She sailed later that day for Bombay, arriving on 4 April. Empire Forest sailed on 26 April for Mombasa, Kenya, where she arrived on 16 May. She sailed the next day for Durban, arriving on 26 May. She departed on 3 June for Port Elizabeth, South Africa, arriving on 5 June.

Empire Forest sailed on 17 June for Durban, arriving two days later. She sailed on 1 July for Colombo, where she arrived on 18 July. She departed on 30 July for Madras, arriving on 1 August. Empire Forest sailed on 20 August for Calcutta, arriving three days later. She departed on 13 September for Cuddalore, India, arriving on 17 September and sailing on 23 September for Aden, where she arrived on 5 October. She sailed the next day for Suez, arriving on 11 October and then sailing to Port Said. She departed on 13 October for Marseille, Bouches-du-Rhône, France, arriving on 19 October. She sailed on 5 November for Leixões, Portugal, where she arrived on 10 November. On 21 November, Empire Forest departed from Leixões for the United Kingdom laden with a cargo of 25 million tins of sardines - almost the whole of Portugal's production for that year. She put into Porto, departing on 23 November for London, where she arrived on 27 November.

In 1946, Empire Forest was sold to Clan Line Steamers Ltd and was renamed Clan Allan. Her port of registry was Glasgow. In 1958, she was sold to Bullard, King & Co. Ltd. and renamed Umtali. Her port of registry was London. She was sold back to Clan Line in 1959 and reverted to her former name. Clan Allan was sold to Mullion & Co Ltd, Hong Kong in 1961 and renamed Ardsirod. She arrived at Kaohsiung, Taiwan on 12 October 1966 for scrapping.
