= SS Empire Bunting =

World War II merchant ship of the United Kingdom

History
- Name: Eelbeck (1919–41); Empire Bunting (1941–47)
- Owner: United States Shipping Board (1919–37); United States Maritime Commission (1937–41); Ministry of War Transport (1941–44); Admiralty (1944)
- Operator: United States Shipping Board (1919–37); United States Maritime Commission (1937–41); Headlam & Son (1941–44); J&J Denholm Ltd (1944)
- Port of registry: (United States) Seattle (1919–41); (United Kingdom) London (1941–44)
- Builder: Skinner & Eddy Corporation, Seattle, Washington
- Yard number: 57
- Launched: 28 June 1919
- Completed: August 1919
- Identification: United States Official Number 218667 (1919–41); United Kingdom Official Number 168163 (1941–44); code letters LSGC (1919–34); Call sign KINQ (1934–41); call sign GNKN (1941–44)
- Fate: Sunk as a blockship on 9 June 1944; Re-floated and scrapped in 1947

General characteristics
- Tonnage: 6,318 GRT
- Length: 401 ft 7 in (122.40 m)
- Beam: 54 ft 8 in (16.66 m)
- Depth: 32 ft 5 in (9.88 m)
- Speed: 11.5 knots (21.3 km/h)

Location of the sinking of Empire Bunting.

SS Empire Bunting was a 6,318 GRT cargo ship which was built in 1919. She saw service between the wars under the US flag and was transferred to the UK Ministry of War Transport in the Second World War. She made a number of cross-Atlantic voyages, often sailing in convoys. She ended her career by being sunk as a blockship on the Normandy coast, supporting the allied landings there in 1944.

== Description ==
Empire Bunting was built as Eelbeck by the shipbuilding firm of Skinner & Eddy Corporation, Seattle, Washington, and launched on 28 June 1919 and completed in August 1919 for service with United States Shipping Board (USSB). She was 401 feet 7 inches (122.40 m) long, with a beam of 54 feet 8 inches (16.66 m) and a depth of 32 feet 5 inches (9.88 m). She was propelled by a triple expansion steam engine which had cylinders of 24 1/2 inches (62 cm), 41 1/2 inches (105 cm) and 72 inches (180 cm) bore by 48 inches (120 cm) stroke. The engine was built by Hooven, Owens & Rentschler, Hamilton, Ohio. The ship had a speed of 11.5 knots (21.3 km/h).

== Career ==
Eelbeck's port of registry was Seattle. She sailed for the USSB until the board's abolition, and by 1937 was sailing for its successor organisation, the United States Maritime Commission. Eelbeck continued to sail under the American flag after the outbreak of the Second World War, during the period of American neutrality. In 1941, with the American entry to the war, Eelbeck was transferred to the ownership of the Ministry of War Transport, which assigned her to be operated by the firm of Headlam & Sons, under the name of Empire Bunting. Her port of registry was changed to London.

Empire Bunting went on to sail in a considerable number of convoys across the North Atlantic, often carrying scrap steel or general cargo to Britain from Canada or the United States.

SC 38

Convoy SC 38 departed Sydney, Nova Scotia on 22 July 1941 and arrived at Liverpool on 8 August. Empire Bunting was carrying a cargo of scrap steel. She was forced to return to St John's after she collided with the Greek merchant ship Dimitrios Chandris.

SC 121

Convoy SC 121 departed New York on 23 February 1943 and arrived at Liverpool on 14 March. Empire Bunting was one of three ships which joined the convoy from St. John's, Newfoundland. She was carrying a general cargo bound for the Clyde. On 11 March, her steering failed and she arrived at Liverpool under tow.

HX 254

Convoy HX 254 departed New York on 27 August 1943 and arrived at Liverpool on 12 September. Empire Bunting was carrying a general cargo bound for Glasgow. She put into St John's with an engine defect which was causing her to produce heavy smoke and run at reduced speed.

In early 1944 she was reassigned to be operated by J&J Denholm Ltd, but in February she was bought by the Admiralty. She made her last wartime voyage as part of one of the Corn cob convoys, sailing from Poole to the Seine Bay in early June 1944. She was scuttled at Juno Beach on 9 June 1944, forming one of the corn cobs designed to shelter the landing beaches for the invasion forces.

Empire Bunting was salvaged in 1947, towed to Strangford Lough and broken up there.

== Official Numbers, code letters and call signs ==
Official Numbers were a forerunner to IMO Numbers. Eelbeck had the US Official Number 218667. Empire Bunting had the UK Official Number 168163.

Eelbeck used the code letters LSGC until 1934, when they were replaced with the Call sign KINQ. Empire Bunting used the call sign GMKM.
