= SS Nailsea Court =

UK cargo steamship

Coordinates: 58°45′N 21°57′W

History

United Kingdom
- Name: Nailsea Court
- Namesake: Nailsea Court
- Owner: Bantham SS Co Ltd
- Operator: Evans & Reid
- Port of registry: Cardiff
- Builder: Bartram & Sons, Sunderland
- Yard number: 272
- Launched: 9 June 1936
- Completed: August 1936
- Identification: UK official number 162113; call sign GYYM
- Fate: Sunk by torpedo, 10 March 1943

General characteristics
- Tonnage: 4,946 GRT; 2,914 NRT
- Length: 420.3 ft (128.1 m)
- Beam: 56.0 ft (17.1 m)
- Depth: 25.4 ft (7.7 m)
- Installed power: 255 NHP
- Propulsion: 4-cylinder compound engine plus exhaust steam turbine
- Speed: 10 kn (19 km/h)
- Crew: 40 plus 7 DEMS gunners
- Sensors & processing systems: wireless direction finding
- Armament: as DEMS: 1 × 4-inch gun; 1 × QF 12-pounder gun; 4 × machine guns; 4 × PAC rockets
- Notes: sister ships: Nailsea Meadow, Nailsea Manor, Nailsea Moor

SS Nailsea Court was a UK cargo steamship. She was launched in 1936 in Sunderland, England. She was named after Nailsea Court in Somerset, England, which is an historic Elizabethan manor house. A U-boat sank her in the North Atlantic in March 1943. 45 men died and only four survived.

Evans and Reid of Cardiff managed Nailsea Court, and she was the third ship under their management to bear this name. The first was a steamship launched in 1902 as Graphic. She was renamed Nailsea Court in 1915 and sunk by a U-boat in 1917. The second was a steamship launched in 1920 as H. H. Asquith. She was renamed Nailsea Court in 1932, then Nailsea Manor in 1936, then sold and renamed Danbryn in 1937.

== Building ==
In 1936–37 Bartram & Sons built four sister ships for two companies linked to Evans and Reid of Cardiff. Nailsea Court and Nailsea Meadow were launched in 1936. Nailsea Moor and Nailsea Manor were launched in 1937.

Nailsea Court was the first of the four sisters to be built. She was launched on 9 June 1936 and completed that August.

Unusually for steamships built in the 1930s the four sisters each had a compound engine. Triple-expansion engines had largely superseded compound engines in the 1860s. But in these four sisters the compound engine was combined with an exhaust steam turbine to achieve a third stage of steam expansion and hence economy in bunkering.

The compound engine had two high- and two low-pressure cylinders and drove the propeller shaft by single-reduction gearing. Exhaust steam from its two low-pressure cylinders powered a single exhaust steam turbine, which drove the same propeller shaft via double-reduction gearing. The compound engine was made by White's Marine Engineering Company of Hebburn. The compound engine plus exhaust turbine gave Nailsea Court a speed of 10 knots (19 km/h).

== War service ==
In the Second World War Nailsea Court was defensively armed. By 1943 her armament included one four-inch gun, one 12-pounder quick-firing gun, four machine guns and four PAC rockets.

Nailsea Court sailed in numerous Battle of the Atlantic convoys. Between October 1939 and her loss in March 1943 she sailed in four HX convoys from Halifax, Nova Scotia to Liverpool and three SC convoys from Sydney, Nova Scotia to Liverpool.

Her cargoes to the UK included wheat and cotton in Convoy HX 6 in October and November 1939, grain in Convoy HX 46 in May and June 1940, sugar in Convoy SC 17 in December 1940 and January 1941, wheat in Convoy HX 117 in March and April 1941, steel in Convoy HX 134 in June and July 1941, a mixed cargo in Convoy SC 44 in September 1941, and copper bar, nickel ore and asbestos in Convoy SC 121 in February and March 1943.

Nailsea Court occasionally sailed to other theatres of the war. In March and February 1940 she sailed to Alexandria in Egypt, with Convoy OG 16 taking her as far as Gibraltar. In November 1941 she sailed to Freetown in Sierra Leone in Convoy OS 11. Her cargoes on these two voyages are not recorded.

=== Loss ===
On 23 February 1943 Nailsea Court left New York City in Convoy SC 121 bound for Liverpool. Her cargo included 6,500 tons of copper bars, 800 tons of nickel ore, and asbestos. Nailsea Court was also carrying two passengers: a mining engineer and an electrical engineer, both of whom had embarked at Freetown.

SC 121 ran into Force 10 gales which lasted for nine days and forced the convoy to scatter to avoid collision. U-boats started to attack SC 121 on the night of 6–7 March and sank five cargo ships on 8 March. On 9 March escorts were reinforced by a US Navy destroyer, two US Coast Guard cutters and air cover from No. 120 Squadron RAF, but U-boats sank another four cargo ships.

At 0104 hrs on 10 March SC 121 was south of Iceland when German submarine U-229 fired a salvo of two torpedoes at the convoy. One damaged the cargo ship Coulmore, and 40 of her 47 crew were lost. The other hit the port side of Nailsea Court in her number one hold. The Second Engineer, who survived, reported a second torpedo then hitting her in her number two hold.

The order was given to abandon ship. The engine room crew, led by the Fourth Engineer, Ronald Dryden, shut down Nailsea Court's engines and her circulating pump. Both actions were important to evacuate the ship safely. The outlet from the circulating pump discharged from the side of the ship just where one of the lifeboats was to be lowered. Had it not been shut down, its discharge would have swamped the lifeboat.

There was no time for the wireless officers to transmit a distress message or for anyone to fire a distress flare.

The starboard motor boat was damaged, and the port lifeboat had been damaged the day before by a heavy sea, so only the starboard lifeboat and the ship's life-rafts were usable. As the crew tried to launch this boat its forward fall jammed, and as they tried to free it a seaman got his hand caught in the block. Eventually the Second Officer, RA Johannesen, and some seamen managed to lift the boat and free the man's hand.

The lifeboat was launched carrying 25 men, and most of the rest of the crew got away in life-rafts. The last four men left aboard were the Master, Robert Lee, Second Officer Johannesen, the Second Engineer, HCC Bette, and one of the ship's apprentices. They jumped overboard, with Captain Lee being last to go. Nailsea Court sank 12 minutes after she was hit, bow first and with her stern lifted clear of the water.

Nailsea Court's lifeboat picked up Captain Lee, Mr Bette, and several survivors from Colmore, until the boat was carrying 37 men. She was shipping water and her occupants were struggling to bale her out. The Royal Canadian Navy corvette HMCS Dauphin tried to reach the lifeboat, but her steering gear failed forcing her to stop only 250 yards away.

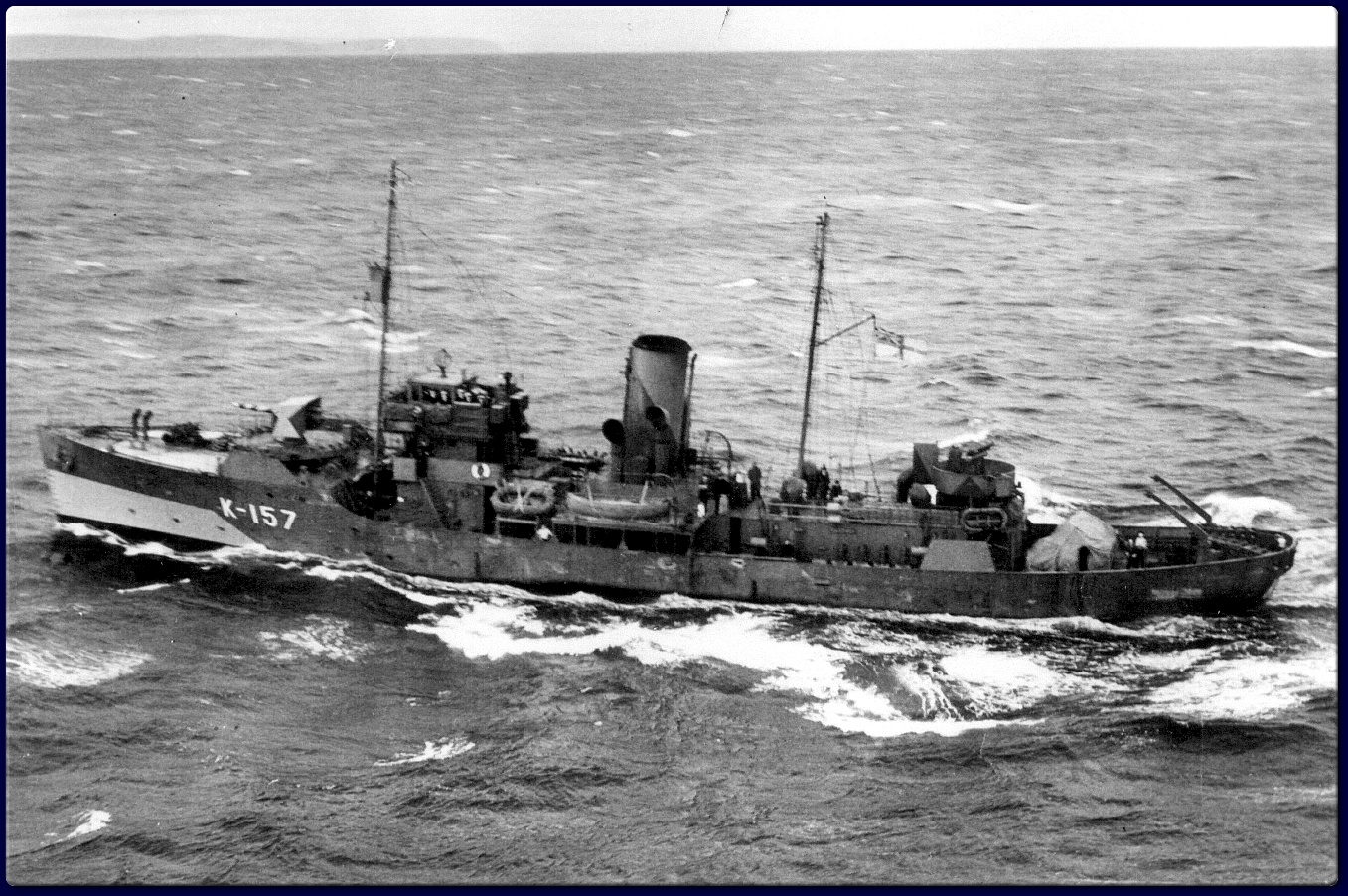
HMCS Dauphin was within 250 yards of Nailsea Court's lifeboat when she was stopped by the failure of her steering gear. As a result, 34 of the boat's occupants were lost and only three were rescued.

About half an hour later the lifeboat capsized. The sea swept away exhausted men. Bette counted 17 men clinging to the keel of the upturned boat, but later he counted only seven. Dauphin managed to reach the boat about three and a half hours after it capsized. The corvette rescued Bette, the mess-room steward and a greaser. Bette could not tell whether the other four men were dead, or dared not let go of the boat to be rescued.

The rescue ship Melrose Abbey found the port life-raft. Two men were in it, but only one was left alive.

Captain Lee, 33 of his officers and men, all nine DEMS gunners and both passengers were lost.

== Aftermath ==
Bette reported that all of the officers and men conducted themselves well and there was no panic. He particularly praised Captain Lee and Mr Johannesen for their leadership in the abandonment of the ship, and Fourth Engineer Dryden, Greaser William Perkes and Fireman Percy Barnes for remaining at their posts in the engine room until they had made it safe to abandon ship.

In July 1943 Johannesen, Dryden, Perkes and Barnes were awarded commendations. Johannesen's commendation was posthumous.
