= German submarine U-229 =

German World War II submarine

History

Nazi Germany
- Name: U-229
- Ordered: 7 December 1940
- Builder: Germaniawerft, Kiel
- Yard number: 659
- Laid down: 3 November 1941
- Launched: 20 August 1942
- Commissioned: 3 October 1942
- Fate: Sunk, 22 September 1943

General characteristics
- Class & type: Type VIIC submarine
- Displacement: 769 tonnes (757 long tons) surfaced; 871 t (857 long tons) submerged
- Length: 67.10 m (220 ft 2 in) o/a; 50.50 m (165 ft 8 in) pressure hull
- Beam: 6.20 m (20 ft 4 in) o/a; 4.70 m (15 ft 5 in) pressure hull
- Height: 9.60 m (31 ft 6 in)
- Draught: 4.74 m (15 ft 7 in)
- Installed power: 2,800–3,200 PS (2,100–2,400 kW; 2,800–3,200 bhp) (diesels); 750 PS (550 kW; 740 shp) (electric)
- Propulsion: 2 shafts; 2 × diesel engines; 2 × electric motors
- Speed: 17.7 knots (32.8 km/h) surfaced; 7.6 knots (14.1 km/h) submerged
- Range: 8,500 nmi (15,700 km) at 10 knots (19 km/h) surfaced; 80 nmi (150 km) at 4 knots (7.4 km/h) submerged
- Test depth: 230 m (750 ft); Crush depth: 250–295 m (820–968 ft)
- Complement: 4 officers, 40–56 enlisted
- Armament: 5 × 53.3 cm (21 in) torpedo tubes (four bow, one stern); 14 × torpedoes or 26 TMA mines; 1 × 8.8 cm (3.46 in) deck gun (220 rounds); 1 x 2 cm (0.79 in) C/30 AA gun

Service record
- Part of: 5th U-boat Flotilla; 3 October 1942 – 28 February 1943; 6th U-boat Flotilla; 1 March – 22 September 1943
- Identification codes: M 49 281
- Commanders: Oblt.z.S. Robert Schetelig; 3 October 1942 – 22 September 1943
- Operations: 3 patrols: 1st patrol: 20 February – 17 April 1943; 2nd patrol: a. 11 May – 7 June 1943; b. 2 – 3 August 1943; 3rd patrol: 31 August – 22 September 1943
- Victories: 2 merchant ships sunk (8,352 GRT); 1 merchant ship damaged (3,670 GRT)

German submarine U-229 was a Type VIIC U-boat of Nazi Germany's Kriegsmarine during World War II.

The submarine was laid down on 3 November 1941 at the Friedrich Krupp Germaniawerft yard at Kiel as yard number 659, launched on 20 August 1942, and commissioned on 3 October under the command of Oberleutnant zur See Robert Schetelig.

After training with the 5th U-boat Flotilla at Kiel, U-229 was transferred to the 6th U-boat Flotilla, (which was based at Saint-Nazaire on the French Atlantic coast), on 1 March 1943, for front-line service. In three war patrols the U-boat sank two merchant ships, totalling 8,352 gross register tons (GRT) and damaged another of 3,670 GRT.

She was sunk by a British warship on 22 September 1943.

== Design ==
German Type VIIC submarines were preceded by the shorter Type VIIB submarines. U-229 had a displacement of 769 tonnes (757 long tons) when at the surface and 871 tonnes (857 long tons) while submerged. She had a total length of 67.10 m (220 ft 2 in), a pressure hull length of 50.50 m (165 ft 8 in), a beam of 6.20 m (20 ft 4 in), a height of 9.60 m (31 ft 6 in), and a draught of 4.74 m (15 ft 7 in).

The submarine was powered by two Germaniawerft F46 four-stroke, six-cylinder supercharged diesel engines producing a total of 2,800 to 3,200 metric horsepower (2,060 to 2,350 kW; 2,760 to 3,160 shp) for use while surfaced, two AEG GU 460/8–27 double-acting electric motors producing a total of 750 metric horsepower (550 kW; 740 shp) for use while submerged. She had two shafts and two 1.23 m (4 ft) propellers. The boat was capable of operating at depths of up to 230 metres (750 ft).

The submarine had a maximum surface speed of 17.7 knots (32.8 km/h) and a maximum submerged speed of 7.6 knots (14.1 km/h). When submerged, the boat could operate for 80 nautical miles (150 km) at 4 knots (7.4 km/h); when surfaced, she could travel 8,500 nautical miles (15,700 km) at 10 knots (19 km/h). U-229 was fitted with five 53.3 cm (21 in) torpedo tubes (four fitted at the bow and one at the stern), fourteen torpedoes, one 8.8 cm (3.46 in) SK C/35 naval gun, 220 rounds, and an anti-aircraft gun. The boat had a complement of between 44 and 60.

== Service history ==
=== First patrol ===
U-229 left Kiel on 20 February 1943. She crossed the North Sea, passed through the gap between Iceland and the Faroe Islands and entered the Atlantic Ocean.

She sank the British freighter Nailsea Court – part of convoy SC 121 on 10 March 1943 southeast of Cape Farewell, Greenland. In the same attack she damaged the British freighter Coulmore, which remained afloat but was abandoned by her crew.

She then sank the Swedish Vaalaren in the same vicinity on 5 April. There were no survivors.

U-229 arrived at St Nazaire on 17 April.

=== Second patrol ===
The boat's second foray commenced with her departure from St Nazaire on 11 May 1943. On the 17th, west of the Bay of Biscay, she was attacked by a Catalina flying boat of No. 190 Squadron RAF. The damage inflicted was such that she was forced to return to France, arriving in Bordeaux on 7 June.

=== Third patrol ===
Having moved from Bordeaux to La Pallice in early August 1943, the boat departed the latter port on the 31st.

=== Fate ===
She was sunk on 22 September 1943 south-east of Cape Farewell, Greenland in position 54°36′N 36°25′W, by depth charges, gunfire and ramming by the British destroyer HMS Keppel. All 50 hands were lost.

=== Wolfpacks ===
U-229 took part in four wolfpacks, namely:

- Neuland (4 – 6 March 1943)
- Ostmark (6 – 11 March 1943)
- Stürmer (11 – 16 March 1943)
- Leuthen (15 – 23 September 1943)

== Summary of raiding history ==
Date	Name	Nationality	Tonnage (GRT)	Fate
10 March 1943	Coulmore	United Kingdom	3,670	Damaged
10 March 1943	Nailsea Court	United Kingdom	4,946	Sunk
5 April 1943	Vaalaren	Sweden	3,406	Sunk

== Bibliography ==
- Busch, Rainer; Röll, Hans-Joachim (1999). German U-boat commanders of World War II : a biographical dictionary. Translated by Brooks, Geoffrey. London, Annapolis, Md: Greenhill Books, Naval Institute Press. ISBN 1-55750-186-6.
- Busch, Rainer; Röll, Hans-Joachim (1999). Deutsche U-Boot-Verluste von September 1939 bis Mai 1945 [German U-boat losses from September 1939 to May 1945]. Der U-Boot-Krieg (in German). Vol. IV. Hamburg, Berlin, Bonn: Mittler. ISBN 3-8132-0514-2.
- Edwards, Bernard (1996). Dönitz and the Wolf Packs - The U-boats at War. Cassell Military Classics. pp. 171, 182, 219, 220. ISBN 0-304-35203-9.
- Gröner, Erich; Jung, Dieter; Maass, Martin (1991). U-boats and Mine Warfare Vessels. German Warships 1815–1945. Vol. 2. Translated by Thomas, Keith; Magowan, Rachel. London: Conway Maritime Press. ISBN 0-85177-593-4.
- Kemp, Paul (1999). U-Boats Destroyed - German Submarine Losses in the World Wars. London: Arms & Armour. ISBN 1-85409-515-3.
