= HMS Itchen =

HMS Itchen may refer to one of the following British Royal Navy ships named after the English River Itchen:

- HMS Itchen (1903), a River-class destroyer launched in 1903 and torpedoed in the North Sea on 6 July 1917 by the German U-boat UC-44.
- HMS Itchen (K227), a River-class frigate launched in 1942 and sunk on 23 September 1943 when hit by an acoustic homing torpedo fired by the German submarine U-666. There were only three survivors from her crew and the 81 survivors from HMS Polyanthus and HMCS St. Croix that she was carrying.
- HMS Itchen (M1217), a River-class minesweeper launched on 30 June 1984. She was based at Southampton (Solent Division RNR), sold to the Brazilian government in 1998, and renamed Bracui.
