= Convoy HX 237 =

North Atlantic convoy

- Part of World War II
| Date | 9–13 May 1943 |
| Location | North Atlantic |
| Result | Inconclusive |

Belligerents
| (Nazi Germany) Germany | United Kingdom; Canada |

Commanders and leaders
| Admiral Karl Dönitz | Comm: R Gill; C-2 Group: EH Chavasse |

Strength
| 19 U-boats | 47 ships 5 escorts |

Casualties and losses
| 3 U-boats destroyed 144 dead | 3 ships sunk (21,389 GRT); 58 dead |

HX 237 was a North Atlantic convoy of the HX series which ran during the Battle of the Atlantic in World War II. It was one of several convoy battles that occurred during the crisis month of May 1943.

== Background ==
HX 237 was an east bound convoy of 47 ships, plus local contingents, which sailed from New York on 1 May 1943 bound for Liverpool and carrying war materials. Convoy commodore was Capt. R Gill RNR in Pacific Enterprise. Mid-Ocean Escort Force group C2 joined the convoy from St. John's on 7 May. Escort group C2 was led by Cdr EH Chavasse in destroyer Broadway; other ships of this group were frigate Lagan and three corvettes. These were joined on the same day by a Support Group, SG 5, comprising escort carrier Biter and four destroyers.

Arrayed against them in the North Atlantic were the patrol lines Rhein, Elbe and Drossel, though although in the event only Rhein and Drossel, comprising 19 U-boats, engaged HX 237.

== Action ==
First contact was made on 9 May by U-359, which called up other boats from Rhein and commenced shadowing. U-359 was attacked by an escort, and lost contact, but the following day, 10 May, contact was regained by U-454. She also was driven off, by aircraft from Biter, but by evening a number of U-boats from both groups were in contact and began their attack. These were unable to penetrate the escort screen, though three ships that had become separated were sunk; the Liberty ship Fort Concord, sunk by U-403 and U-456 in the early hours of 11 May; the Norwegian tanker Sandanger, sunk by U-221 on 12 May, and Norwegian freighter Brand, sunk by U-603 on the night of 12/13 May.

On 12 May U-89 was sighted by a Swordfish from Biter and destroyed by Broadway and Lagan. Later the same day HX 237 came within range of Coastal Command aircraft, and Biter and her group detached to go to the aid of SC 129, which was coming under attack 200 miles to the south-west. That night U-456 was attacked by a Liberator flying at long range. The aircraft used FIDO, a new and secret homing torpedo, on the rapidly diving U-boat; she was damaged, but was able to surface and drive off the aircraft with anti-aircraft fire. The Liberator was able to summon help, however, and the next morning the destroyer Opportune found U-456 and attacked. The U-boat crash-dived, but was not seen again; it was later presumed she had been fatally damaged by the aircraft attack, the first instance of a U-boat being sunk by FIDO.

On 13 May U-753 was found and attacked by a Sunderland, but the U-boat chose not to dive to escape, driving off the aircraft with flak. The Sunderland commenced circling and summoned help, which came in the form of Lagan and Drumheller. As U-753 dived away the Sunderland attacked with depth charges, followed by depth charges from the two ships. Nothing more was heard from U-753 and post-war analysis credited the aircraft and two ships with her destruction.

With these losses, and little success in breaching the convoy's defences, BdU called off the attack.

HX 237 continued without further interference and arrived at Liverpool on 17 May 1943.

== Ships in the convoy ==
| Name | Flag | Tonnage (GRT) | Notes |
|---|---|---|---|
| Aedanus Burke (1943) | United States | 7,176 | Returned |
| Alcoa Trader (1920) | United States | 4,986 | |
| Avristan (1942) | United Kingdom | 7,266 | |
| Belgian Gulf (1929) | Panama | 8,237 | |
| HMS Biter | Royal Navy | | Escort 7 May - 13 May; Escort carrier |
| Braga (1938) | Norway | 1,671 | Uk For Iceland |
| Brand (1927) | Norway | 4,819 | Straggled and sunk by U-603 on 12 May |
| British Valour (1927) | United Kingdom | 6,952 | Escort Oiler |
| HMS Broadway | Royal Navy | | Escort 7 May - 16 May |
| HMCS Chambly | Royal Canadian Navy | | Escort 7 May - 16 May; Corvette |
| City Of Dundee (1921) | United Kingdom | 5,273 | |
| City Of Eastbourne (1923) | United Kingdom | 5,563 | |
| Clan Macarthur (1936) | United Kingdom | 10,528 | |
| Consuelo (1937) | United Kingdom | 4,847 | Vice-Commodore |
| Delhi (1925) | Sweden | 4,571 | |
| Dorcasia (1938) | United Kingdom | 8,053 | |
| Dromore (1920) | United Kingdom | 4,096 | |
| HMCS Drumheller | Royal Canadian Navy | | Escort 7 May - 16 May; Corvette |
| Empire Emerald (1941) | United Kingdom | 8,032 | |
| Ernebank (1937) | United Kingdom | 5,388 | |
| Fort Aklavik (1943) | United Kingdom | 7,132 | |
| Fort Concord (1942) | United Kingdom | 7,138 | Straggled 7 May, Sunk 11 May by U-403 and U-456 |
| Frontenac (1928) | Norway | 7,350 | |
| G C Brovig (1930) | Norway | 9,718 | |
| Gdynia (1934) | Sweden | 1,636 | |
| Gulfwing (1928) | United States | 10,217 | Escort Oiler |
| Henry Villard (1942) | United States | 7,176 | |
| Herbrand (1935) | Norway | 9,108 | |
| James Turner (1942) | United States | 7,177 | |
| John F Appleby (1942) | United States | 7,181 | |
| Joseph Warren (1943) | United States | 7,176 | Fitted With Anti-torpedo Net Device (AND) |
| HMS Kirkella | Royal Navy | | Escort 16 May - 17 May; ASW trawler |
| Kong Sverre (1941) | Norway | 7,238 | |
| Lady Rodney (1929) | United Kingdom | 8,194 | Halifax to St. John's, Newfoundland |
| HMS Lagan | Royal Navy | | Escort 7 May - 16 May; Frigate |
| Laurent Meeus (1930) | Belgium | 6,429 | |
| Leerdam (1921) | Netherlands | 8,815 | |
| Magdala (1931) | Netherlands | 8,248 | |
| HMCS Morden | Royal Canadian Navy | | Escort 7 May - 16 May; Corvette |
| Mormacmar (1920) | United States | 5,453 | |
| Moses Cleaveland (1943) | United States | 7,176 | |
| HMCS Noranda | Royal Canadian Navy | | Escort 1 May - 4 May |
| Norefjord (1920) | Norway | 3,082 | |
| Norholm (1941) | Norway | 9,813 | |
| Northern Sun (1931) | United States | 8,865 | |
| HMS Obdurate | Royal Navy | | Escort 9 May - 13 May; Destroyer |
| Opalia (1938) | United Kingdom | 6,195 | |
| HMS Opportune | Royal Navy | | Escort 9 May - 13 May; Destroyer |
| Pacific Enterprise (1927) | United Kingdom | 6,736 | Capt R Gill CBE Rd RNR (Commodore) |
| HMS Pathfinder | Royal Navy | | Escort 9 May - 13 May; Destroyer |
| HMS Primrose | Royal Navy | | Escort 7 May - 16 May; Corvette |
| Richard Hovey (1943) | United States | 7,176 | Fitted With Anti-torpedo Net Device (AND) |
| Saint Bertrand (1929) | United Kingdom | 5,522 | |
| Sandanger (1938) | Norway | 9,432 | Straggled 8 May and sunk by U-221 |
| Spinanger (1927) | Norway | 7,429 | Escort Oiler |
| HNoMS St. Albans | Royal Norwegian Navy | | Escort 4 May - 7 May; Destroyer |
| Stanmore (1940) | United Kingdom | 4,970 | |
| Stephen A Douglas (1942) | United States | 7,176 | Returned |
| Strinda (1937) | Norway | 10,973 | Escort Oiler |
| HMCS Timmins | Royal Canadian Navy | | Escort 1 May - 6 May; Corvette |
| HMCS Trail | Royal Canadian Navy | | Escort 1 May - 7 May; Corvette |
| Trondheim (1939) | Norway | 8,258 | |
| USS Yukon | United States Navy | 5,970 | Store ship |
| Warfield (1917) | United Kingdom | 6,070 | |
| Wendell Phillips (1942) | United States | 7,176 | Joined Convoy ON 180 & returned St. John's, Newfoundland |
| Winona (1919) | United States | 6,197 | Returned to St. John's, Newfoundland |

== Aftermath ==
HX 237 was seen as a success by the Allies. Three ships had been lost, but 38 ships arrived safely; another four had been forced to return and two had detached to other destinations. In return, three U-boats had been destroyed, though two of these were unconfirmed at the time. Several others had been damaged and forced to return to base. The convoy was another in a series of set-backs suffered by the U-boat Arm, collectively known as Black May.
