= USS McCook =

Two ships of the United States Navy have been named USS McCook for Commander Roderick S. McCook (1839 – 1886).

- USS McCook (DD-252), was a Clemson-class destroyer, commissioned in 1919 and transferred to the Royal Navy as HMS St. Croix.
- USS McCook (DD-496), was a Gleaves-class destroyer, commissioned in 1943 and decommissioned in 1949
