= K227 =

K227 or K-227 may refer to:

- K-227 (Kansas highway), a former state highway in Kansas
- HMS Itchen (K227), a former UK Royal Navy ship
