= German submarine U-753 =

German World War II submarine

Coordinates: 48°37′N 22°39′W

History

Nazi Germany
- Name: U-753
- Ordered: 9 October 1939
- Builder: Kriegsmarinewerft Wilhelmshaven
- Yard number: 136
- Laid down: 3 January 1940
- Launched: 26 April 1941
- Commissioned: 18 June 1941
- Fate: Sunk on 13 May 1943

General characteristics
- Class & type: Type VIIC submarine
- Displacement: 769 tonnes (757 long tons) surfaced; 871 t (857 long tons) submerged
- Length: 67.10 m (220 ft 2 in) o/a; 50.50 m (165 ft 8 in) pressure hull
- Beam: 6.20 m (20 ft 4 in) o/a; 4.70 m (15 ft 5 in) pressure hull
- Height: 9.60 m (31 ft 6 in)
- Draught: 4.74 m (15 ft 7 in)
- Installed power: 2,800–3,200 PS (2,100–2,400 kW; 2,800–3,200 bhp) (diesels); 750 PS (550 kW; 740 shp) (electric)
- Propulsion: 2 shafts; 2 × diesel engines; 2 × electric motors
- Speed: 17.7 knots (32.8 km/h; 20.4 mph) surfaced; 7.6 knots (14.1 km/h; 8.7 mph) submerged
- Range: 8,500 nmi (15,700 km; 9,800 mi) at 10 knots (19 km/h; 12 mph) surfaced; 80 nmi (150 km; 92 mi) at 4 knots (7.4 km/h; 4.6 mph) submerged
- Test depth: 230 m (750 ft); Crush depth: 250–295 m (820–968 ft)
- Complement: 4 officers, 40–56 enlisted
- Armament: 5 × 53.3 cm (21 in) torpedo tubes (four bow, one stern); 14 × torpedoes or 26 TMA mines; 1 × 8.8 cm (3.46 in) deck gun (220 rounds); 1 x 2 cm (0.79 in) C/30 AA gun

Service record
- Part of: 3rd U-boat Flotilla; 18 June 1941 – 13 May 1943
- Identification codes: M 44 578
- Commanders: K.Kapt. / F.Kapt. Alfred Manhardt von Mannstein; 18 June 1941 – 13 May 1943
- Operations: 7 patrols: 1st patrol: 24 – 30 December 1941; 2nd patrol: 17 January – 1 February 1942; 3rd patrol: 26 February – 26 March 1942; 4th patrol: 22 April – 25 June 1942; 5th patrol: a. 1 – 4 September 1942; b. 20 September – 8 December 1942; 6th patrol: 28 January – 10 March 1943; 7th patrol: 5 – 13 May 1943
- Victories: 3 merchant ships sunk (23,117 GRT); 2 merchant ships damaged (6,908 GRT)

German submarine U-753 was a Type VIIC U-boat built for Nazi Germany's Kriegsmarine for service during World War II. Commissioned on 18 June 1941, she served with 3rd U-boat Flotilla until 30 November as a training boat, and as a front boat until 13 May 1943 under the command of Fregattenkapitän Alfred Manhardt von Mannstein.

== Design ==
German Type VIIC submarines were preceded by the shorter Type VIIB submarines. U-753 had a displacement of 769 tonnes (757 long tons) when at the surface and 871 tonnes (857 long tons) while submerged. She had a total length of 67.10 m (220 ft 2 in), a pressure hull length of 50.50 m (165 ft 8 in), a beam of 6.20 m (20 ft 4 in), a height of 9.60 m (31 ft 6 in), and a draught of 4.74 m (15 ft 7 in). The submarine was powered by two Germaniawerft F46 four-stroke, six-cylinder supercharged diesel engines producing a total of 2,800 to 3,200 metric horsepower (2,060 to 2,350 kW; 2,760 to 3,160 shp) for use while surfaced, two Garbe, Lahmeyer & Co. RP 137/c double-acting electric motors producing a total of 750 metric horsepower (550 kW; 740 shp) for use while submerged. She had two shafts and two 1.23 m (4 ft) propellers. The boat was capable of operating at depths of up to 230 metres (750 ft).

The submarine had a maximum surface speed of 17.7 knots (32.8 km/h; 20.4 mph) and a maximum submerged speed of 7.6 knots (14.1 km/h; 8.7 mph). When submerged, the boat could operate for 80 nautical miles (150 km; 92 mi) at 4 knots (7.4 km/h; 4.6 mph); when surfaced, she could travel 8,500 nautical miles (15,700 km; 9,800 mi) at 10 knots (19 km/h; 12 mph). U-753 was fitted with five 53.3 cm (21 in) torpedo tubes (four fitted at the bow and one at the stern), fourteen torpedoes, one 8.8 cm (3.46 in) SK C/35 naval gun, 220 rounds, and a 2 cm (0.79 in) C/30 anti-aircraft gun. The boat had a complement of between forty-four and sixty.

== Service history ==
On her sixty-five-day fourth Patrol, U-753 sank two vessels and damaging a further two in the West Indies. Her first victim was twenty-eight days into her voyage, an American merchant vessel, the George Calvert on 20 May 1942. George Calvert was destroyed by three torpedoes off the coast of Cuba, killing three of her fifty-one man crew.

Two days later, E.P. Theriault, a British sailing ship, was attacked by U-753. She did not sink, however, and was taken back to Cuba and repaired. On the morning of 25 May, the Norwegian tanker Haakon Hauan was hit by one of U-753's torpedoes. This vessel also survived and was repaired. The Norwegian tanker Hamlet, however, did not escape when she encountered the U-boat two days later. Three torpedoes were fired between eleven o'clock and noon. All thirty-six crewmembers survived the sinking and were rescued by nearby fishing boats.

U-753's sixth patrol had her patrolling the North Atlantic, on the European side. Twenty-five days into her forty-two-day voyage on 22 February, U-753 found the ON 166 convoy in the mid-Atlantic, her target: the Norwegian Whale ship N.T. Nielsen-Alonso. The vessel had in fact been abandoned earlier that day after an attack from U-92. U-753 fired two coups de grâce but only hit the ship with one of the torpedoes, failing to sink it. The submarine was forced to leave after a Corvette took notice.

== Encounter with Irish Willow ==
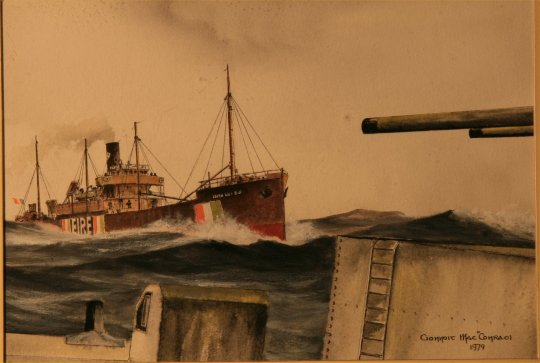
Oil painting by Kenneth King from the deck of U-753, signaling to Irish Willow "send master and ships papers" National Maritime Museum of Ireland

On the morning of 16 March 1942, U-753 sighted a lone ship, south-west of the Rockall Bank, it was the Irish Willow and prepared to sink her, until they saw her neutral markings (the Irish tricolour and the word "EIRE"). At 2 pm U-753 surfaced and signaled "send master and ship's papers". As Captain Shanks was born in Belfast, and could be regarded as British, this was considered unwise. Chief Officer Henry Cullen, with four crew as oarsmen went instead. In the conning tower, he explained that his 39-year-old Captain was too elderly for the small boat. He reminded them that the next day would be Saint Patrick's Day. Tumblers of Schnapps were produced, along with a bottle of Cognac, for the crew.

== Fate ==
U-753 set off on her seventh and final patrol on 5 May 1943. Eight days in, she was discovered 10 nautical miles (19 km) away from convoy HX 237 by a Sunderland aircraft of No. 423 Squadron RCAF. After a twenty-minute exchange of fire with the aircraft, U-753 dove when the corvette HMCS Drumheller joined the engagement. The aircraft dropped two depth charges immediately after. An aircraft from the escort carrier Biter marked the location of the submarine with smoke flares. HMS Lagan caught up to the Drumheller and the two dropped depth charges, finally sinking U-753; all 47 crewmen were lost at sea.

== Wolfpacks ==
U-753 took part in ten wolfpacks, namely:

- Schlei (19 – 24 January 1942)
- Westwall (2 – 12 March 1942)
- Luchs (27 September – 6 October 1942)
- Panther (6 – 16 October 1942)
- Puma (16 – 22 October 1942)
- Natter (2 – 8 November 1942)
- Kreuzotter (8 – 24 November 1942)
- Hartherz (3 – 7 February 1943)
- Ritter (11 – 26 February 1943)
- Drossel (11 – 13 May 1943)

== Summary of raiding history ==
Date	Ship Name	Nationality	Tonnage (GRT)	Fate
20 May 1942	George Calvert	United States	7,191	Sunk
22 May 1942	E.P.Theriault	United Kingdom	326	Damaged
25 May 1942	Haakon Hauan	Norway	6,582	Damaged
27 May 1942	Hamlet	Norway	6,578	Sunk
22 February 1943	N.T.Nielsen-Alonso	Norway	9,348	Sunk

== Bibliography ==
- Busch, Rainer; Röll, Hans-Joachim (1999). German U-boat commanders of World War II : a biographical dictionary. Translated by Brooks, Geoffrey. London, Annapolis, Md: Greenhill Books, Naval Institute Press. ISBN 1-55750-186-6.
- Busch, Rainer; Röll, Hans-Joachim (1999). Der U-Boot-Krieg, 1939-1945: Deutsche U-Boot-Verluste von September 1939 bis Mai 1945 [German U-boat losses from September 1939 to May 1945] (in German). Vol. IV. Hamburg, Berlin, Bonn: Mittler. ISBN 3-8132-0514-2.
- Edwards, Bernard (1996). Dönitz and the Wolf Packs - The U-boats at War. Cassell. pp. 157, 211. ISBN 0-304-35203-9.
- Gröner, Eric; Jung, Dieter; Maass, Martin (1991). German Warships 1815-1945: U-boats and Mine Warfare Vessels. Vol. 2. Translated by Thomas, Keith; Magowan, Rachel. London: Conway Maritime Press. ISBN 0-85177-593-4.
