= HMS Polyanthus (K47) =

Flower-class corvette

Coordinates: 57°0′0″N 31°6′0″W

History

United Kingdom
- Builder: Henry Robb Ltd.
- Laid down: 19 March 1940
- Launched: 30 November 1940
- Completed: 23 April 1941
- Out of service: 21 September 1943
- Fate: Torpedoed and sunk, 21 September 1943

General characteristics
- Class & type: Flower-class corvette
- Displacement: 925 long tons (940 t; 1,036 short tons)
- Length: 205 ft (62.48 m)o/a
- Beam: 33 ft (10.06 m)
- Draught: 11.5 ft (3.51 m)
- Propulsion: single shaft; 2 × water tube boilers; 1 × 4-cycle triple-expansion reciprocating steam engine; 2,750 ihp (2,050 kW)
- Speed: 16 knots (29.6 km/h)
- Range: 3,500 nautical miles (6,482 km) at 12 knots (22.2 km/h)
- Complement: 85
- Armament: 1 × 4-inch BL Mk.IX single gun; 2 × Vickers .50 machine guns (twin); 2 × .303-inch Lewis machine gun (twin); 2 × Mk.II depth charge throwers; 2 × Depth charge rails with 40 depth charges

HMS Polyanthus was a Flower-class corvette of the Royal Navy. She was launched on 30 November 1940 from Leith Docks on the Firth of Forth, at an estimated cost of £55,000. Polyanthus was sunk by the German submarine U-952 using new German weapons technology on 20 September 1943 about 1,000 miles southwest of Reykjavík during convoy escort duty in the Battle of the North Atlantic.

== Background ==
Flower-class corvettes like Polyanthus serving with the Royal Navy during World War II were different from earlier and more traditional sail-driven corvettes. The "corvette" designation was created by the French in the 19th century as a class of small warships; the Royal Navy borrowed the term for a period but discontinued its use in 1877. During the hurried preparations for war in the late 1930s, Winston Churchill reactivated the corvette class, needing a name for smaller ships used in an escort capacity, in this case based on a whaling ship design. The generic name "flower" was used to designate the class of these ships, which – in the Royal Navy – were named after flowering plants.

== War duty and sinking ==
Although designed for quick and cheap construction, Polyanthus and ships like her in the Flower class were operative in convoy escort during the Battle of the North Atlantic. The primary mission of protection against U-boats saw Polyanthus active in several transatlantic convoys in the early part of the war. By late 1943, the Kriegsmarine were using an acoustic homing torpedo - known to the Allies as a GNAT - which they hoped would reverse the changing tide of war, favouring the Allies in the Atlantic.

On the night of 19–20 September 1943, two westbound Convoys ONS18 and ON 202 were facing frequent U-boat engagements, calling Polyanthus to their aid in the wake of several setbacks, including the near destruction of HMS Escapade and HMS Lagan. After successfully driving away U-238, Polyanthus was ordered to rescue the crew from the escort HMCS St. Croix, recently sunk by U-305. Whilst under the command of Lieutenant John Gordon Aitken RNR, Polyanthus was sunk by U-952 using a GNAT before any rescue could be effected. At least 7 officers and 77 crew were lost with Polyanthus among them Lt Graham Shepard. The only known survivor drowned on the morning of 23 September when another U-boat, U-666, torpedoed and sank HMS Itchen, the ship that had rescued him.

== See also ==
- Wolf pack

== Notes and references ==
Notes

Bibliography

- Colledge, J. J.; Warlow, Ben (2006) [1969]. Ships of the Royal Navy: The Complete Record of All Fighting Ships of the Royal Navy from the 15th Century to the Present (3rd Rev ed.). London: Chatham Publishing. ISBN 978-1-86176-281-8. OCLC 67375475.
