= George Prismall =

Australian rules footballer

Personal information
- Full name: George Henry Prismall
- Born: 10 March 1915; Carlton, Victoria
- Original team: Brunswick
- Height: 179 cm (5 ft 10 in)
- Weight: 81 kg (179 lb)

Playing career^{1}
| Years | Club | Games (Goals) |
| 1933–1934 | Brunswick (VFA) | 12 (3) |
| 1935 | Essendon (VFL) | 1 (0) |
- ^{1} Playing statistics correct to the end of 1935.

George Henry Prismall (born 10 March 1915, date of death unknown) was an Australian rules footballer who played with the Brunswick Football Club in the Victorian Football Association (VFA) competition, and with the Essendon Football Club in the Victorian Football League (VFL) competition.

== Family ==
The son of Gladys Prismall, George Henry Prismall was born in Carlton, Victoria on 10 March 1915.

== Football ==
=== Brunswick (VFA) ===
Recruited from the Silvan Football Club in the Yarra Valley Football Association, he played his first match for Brunswick, on the half-back flank, against Preston on 20 May 1933.

=== VFA suspension ===
Prismall was reported on a charge of having kicked Sandringham's Bruce Scharp during the third quarter of the 11 August 1934 match at the Brunswick Football Ground.

At the VFA Tribunal's hearing on 15 August 1934, the charge against Prismall was sustained, and he was disqualified for twelve matches.

=== Essendon (VFL) ===
On 12 June 1935, Prismall was granted a clearance "[from] Fitzroy and Brunswick to Essendon"; and, on 15 June 1935, he played his only First XVIII match for Essendon, against Fitzroy, at Windy Hill.

== Military service ==
He served overseas with the British Merchant Navy during World War II. There is a record of him serving aboard the SS Empire Emerald between Glasgow and New York in June 1943.
