= USS McCook (DD-496) =

Gleaves-class destroyer

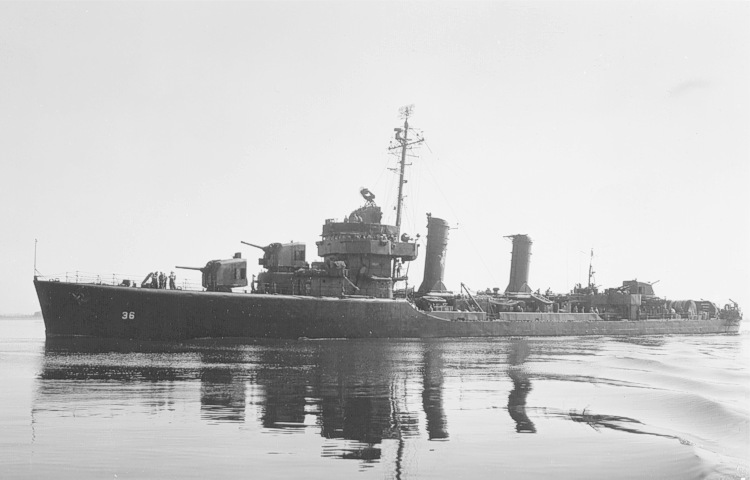
- USS McCook off Philadelphia Navy Yard, 12 July 1945

History

United States
- Name: McCook
- Namesake: Roderick S. McCook
- Builder: Seattle-Tacoma Shipbuilding Corporation
- Laid down: 1 May 1941
- Launched: 30 April 1942
- Commissioned: 15 March 1943
- Identification: DD-496
- Reclassified: DMS-36, 30 May 1945
- Decommissioned: 27 May 1949
- Stricken: 15 January 1972
- Fate: Sold 27 August 1973 and; broken up for scrap

General characteristics
- Class & type: Gleaves-class destroyer
- Displacement: 1,630 tons
- Length: 348 ft 3 in (106.15 m)
- Beam: 36 ft 1 in (11.00 m)
- Draft: 11 ft 10 in (3.61 m)
- Propulsion: 50,000 shp (37,000 kW); 4 boilers; 2 propellers
- Speed: 37.4 knots (69 km/h)
- Range: 6,500 nmi (12,000 km; 7,500 mi) at 12 kn (22 km/h; 14 mph)
- Complement: 16 officers, 260 enlisted
- Armament: 5 × 5 in (127 mm) DP guns, 6 × 0.50 in (12.7 mm) guns, 6 × 20 mm AA guns, 10 × 21 in (533 mm) torpedo tubes, 2 × depth charge tracks

USS McCook (DD-496), a Gleaves-class destroyer, was the second ship of the United States Navy to be named for Commander Roderick S. McCook (1839–1886), who was an officer in the Union Navy during the American Civil War.

McCook was laid down on 1 May 1941 at the Seattle-Tacoma Shipbuilding Corp., Seattle, Washington and launched on 30 April 1942; sponsored by Mrs. Reed Knox, granddaughter of Comdr. McCook. The ship was commissioned on 15 March 1943.

== History ==
=== Initial operations ===
After shakedown out of San Diego, McCook sailed for the east coast 22 May 1943. She reported at Norfolk for duty in the Atlantic Fleet, 6 June, and by the end of the month had begun her first escort assignment, a convoy to Casablanca, departing Norfolk 26 June and returning 17 July. Before the end of the year she completed two more north African convoys, one to the United Kingdom and numerous escort assignments along the northeastern coast. On 15 December, she reported to COTCLANT and spent the next six weeks training destroyer crews out of Norfolk. Detached from training duties, McCook resumed escort work 31 January 1944 when she sailed for Trinidad with new aircraft carrier Wasp on her shakedown cruise, returning with her to Boston on 27 February.

Further training in antisubmarine and antiaircraft warfare took up much of March as McCook prepared to return to European waters. On 18 April, she joined Task Group 27.8 (TG 27.8) and steamed for the United Kingdom, arriving at Plymouth, England on 28 April. The destroyer continued on to Portland and from there participated in a month of intensive amphibious landing exercises at Slapton Sands and at Belfast.

At Weymouth Roads 28 May McCook was caught in an air raid in which she suffered damage to her radar, sound equipment, range finder, and main battery director in addition to having five guns disabled and losing steering control from the bridge. Luckily there were no personnel casualties. The damage threatened to keep her out of the upcoming invasion for which she had been training for the past month. But the fast and efficient craftsmen on board the destroyer tender Melville quickly had her back in fighting trim.

=== Normandy landings, Operation Anvil ===
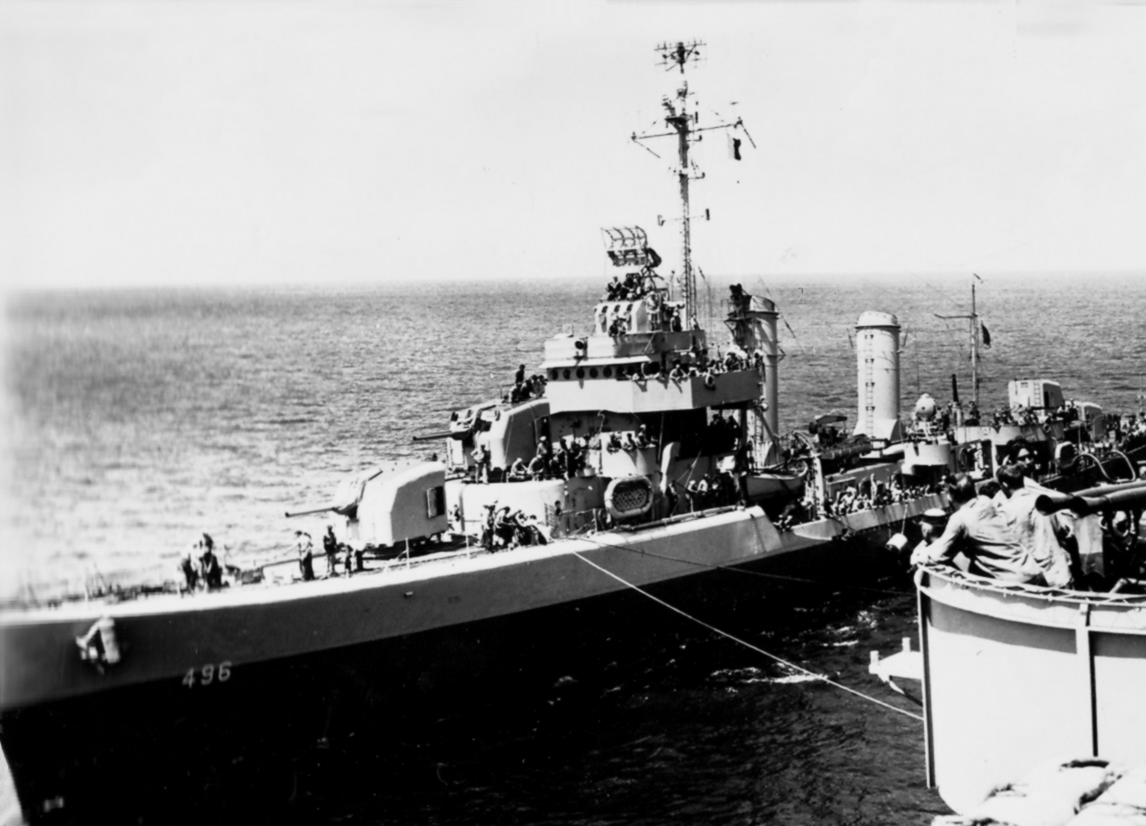
McCook alongside a carrier in the Atlantic Ocean.

On 5 June, McCook departed with Destroyer Squadron 18 (DesRon 18) and ships of Assault Force "O" for the coast of France. Early 6 June, under the command of Lieutenant Commander Ralph Lester Ramey she arrived in the Baie de la Seine and at 03:20 commenced bombardment of the beaches and waterfront of the Pointe du Hoc–Vierville-sur-Mer area. By 06:16 she had neutralized her assigned targets (three pillboxes, 13 machine gun nests and three shore guns) and had begun to take on targets of opportunity. By the end of the day, she had added to her score seven pillboxes, eight gun emplacements and ten stone houses, in which enemy machine guns and snipers had been placed.

Resupplying and fueling at Portland and Plymouth, McCook continued to operate in the invasion area until 14 July. Four days later she was en route to Bizerte screening a convoy of LSTs and infantry landing craft. She delivered her charges on 28 July and steamed to Mers-el-Kebir, where she remained until 4 August. She then sailed to Naples to join the forces assembling for Operation Anvil, the invasion of southern France. On 13 August she sailed for France, arriving on 14 August to take up a screening position south of Toulon. For the next 35 days she remained in the assault area providing gunfire support and screen protection to the Allied combatants and to the supply and reinforcement convoys from Corsica and Naples.

She departed for the United States via Oran and Gibraltar on 21 September. She arrived at New York 3 October, and operated off the east coast until close to the end of the year. She again resumed transatlantic convoy duties on 28 December, completing six by 24 May 1945 when she entered the Philadelphia Navy Yard. There she commenced conversion to a destroyer-minesweeper. She was reclassified DMS-36 on 30 May.

Her conversion completed on 12 July, she conducted minesweeping exercises until 12 August. She then departed for postwar duties in the western Pacific.

=== Postwar services ===
McCook arrived at Okinawa 28 September and, after riding out two typhoons, commenced minesweeping operations in the Yellow Sea toward the end of October. Working with MinRon 1, she cut 77 of the 500 mines swept by that group during the period 23 October to 15 November.

She arrived at Sasebo for duty in the coastal waters of Japan on 17 November. Assigned a courier trip to Wakayama, 14 December, she suffered extensive damage in a typhoon on the return voyage. Repairs were begun upon her return to Sasebo on 18 November and finished the next month. She sailed to the Kure–Hiroshima area to check the swept channels in the Inland Sea on 3 February 1946. Accomplishing that mission by the 26th she steamed to Shanghai, returning two weeks later to Japan. She departed Yokosuka on 12 March for the United States, arriving at San Francisco on 31 March.

McCook remained at San Francisco until 14 January 1947 when she was ordered to San Diego. Working primarily with the Underwater Training Unit, San Diego, she operated out of that port for the next two years. She also participated in destroyer squadron exercises and battle problems off the California coast and in the Hawaiian Islands. A cruise to the Marshalls and the Marianas, 7 July to 11 September 1947, was her only oversea deployment during this period.

By January 1949, deactivation had begun aboard McCook and on 27 May she was decommissioned and was berthed at San Diego as a part of the Pacific Reserve Fleet. Reclassified DD-496 on 15 July 1955, McCook was stricken from the register on 15 January 1972. She was sold 27 August 1973 and broken up for scrap.

McCook received three battle stars for World War II service.
