= HMS Biter (D97) =

1942 Avenger-class escort carrier of the Royal Navy and French Navy

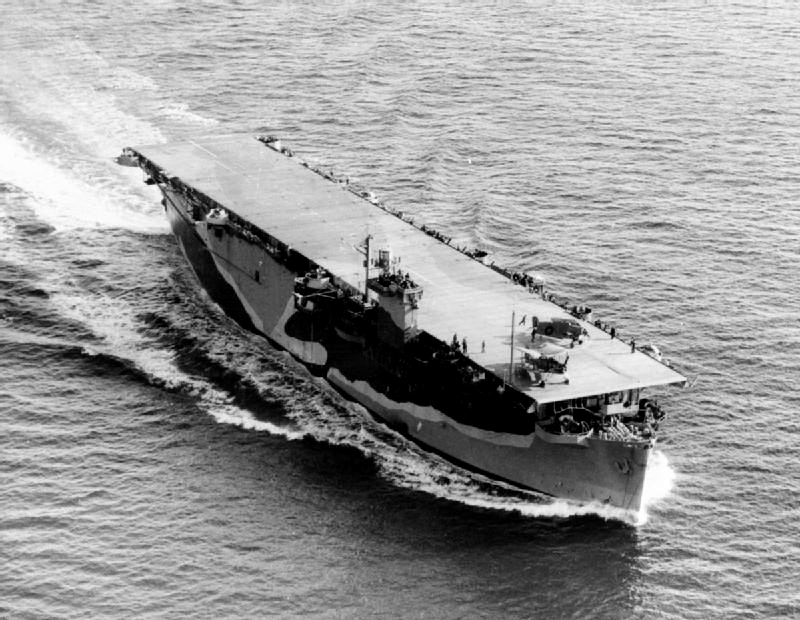
- HMS Biter underway March 1943

History

United Kingdom
- Name: Biter
- Ordered: C3-P&C
- Builder: Sun Shipbuilding
- Laid down: 28 December 1939
- Launched: 18 December 1940
- Commissioned: 6 May 1942
- In service: 1942–1945
- Home port: HMNB Clyde
- Fate: Sold to France 1945

France
- Name: Dixmude
- Acquired: 1945
- Commissioned: 9 April 1945
- Decommissioned: 24 January 1951
- Out of service: 1956
- Honours and awards: Indo-China 1946
- Fate: Sunk as target 10 June 1966

General characteristics
- Class & type: Avenger-class escort carrier
- Displacement: 8,200 long tons (8,332 t) (normal); 9,000 long tons (9,144 t) (deep load)
- Length: 492 ft (150 m)
- Beam: 66 ft 3 in (20.19 m)
- Height: 23 ft 3 in (7.09 m)
- Installed power: 8,500 hp (6,300 kW)
- Propulsion: 4 × diesel engines; 1 × shaft
- Speed: 16.5 kn (19.0 mph; 30.6 km/h)
- Complement: 555
- Armament: 3 × 4 in (100 mm) guns; 15 × 20 mm (0.79 in) anti-aircraft cannons on single and twin mounts
- Aircraft carried: 15–21; a mixture of; Grumman Martlets; Hawker Sea Hurricane; Fairey Swordfish; Grumman Avenger
- Aviation facilities: Hangar: 190 ft × 47 ft (58 m × 14 m) by 47 ft (14 m); 1 × lift: 42 ft × 34 ft (13 m × 10 m); 9 arrester wires

HMS Biter was a Royal Navy escort carrier during the Second World War. She was laid down as a merchant ship at the Sun Shipbuilding & Drydock Company yard at Chester, Pennsylvania, on 28 December 1939, and launched a year later. She was converted to an escort carrier and commissioned in the Royal Navy on 6 May 1942. She was returned to the United States in 1945 and subsequently lent to France.

== Design and description ==
Biter was an Avenger-class escort carrier. These carriers were converted American type C3 merchant ships. Their design was based on the U.S. Navy′s Long Island class (AVG); to differentiate between the two classes, the Royal Navy added the prefix "B" (BAVG). HMS Biter (BAVG3) was built by the Sun Shipbuilding and Drydock Company, originally named the Rio-Parana; she was laid down on 28 December 1939, launched on 18 December 1940 and delivered on 4 September 1941. She was converted to an escort carrier in the Atlantic Basin Iron Works at Brooklyn New York and commissioned into the Royal Navy on 6 May 1942, under the command of Captain Conolly Abel Smith.

Biter had a complement of 555 men and an overall length of 492 ft (150 m), a beam of 66 ft 3 in (20.19 m) and a height of 23 ft 3 in (7.09 m). She displaced 8,200 long tons (8,332 t) at normal load and 9,000 long tons (9,144 t) at deep load. Propulsion was provided by four diesel engines connected to one shaft giving 8,500 hp (6,300 kW), which could propel the ship at 16.5 kn (19.0 mph; 30.6 km/h).

Aircraft facilities were a small combined bridge–flight control on the starboard side and above the 410 ft (120 m) long wooden flight deck, one 43 ft × 34 ft (13 m × 10 m) aircraft lift, one aircraft catapult and nine arrestor wires. Aircraft could be housed in the 190 ft × 47 ft (58 m × 14 m) half hangar below the flight deck. Armament comprised three single mounted 4 in (100 mm) dual purpose guns and fifteen 20 mm cannons on single or twin mounts. She had the capacity for fifteen aircraft which could be a mixture of Grumman Martlet or Hawker Sea Hurricane fighters and Fairey Swordfish or Grumman Avenger torpedo bombers (also used for anti-submarine patrols).

== Service history ==
After commissioning, Biter was being readied to leave New York when a fire broke out on 8 May 1942, in the catapult house which destroyed one of the catapult motors. Eventually believed ready for sea, she left the dock on 15 May but had to return to rectify an engine problem. Ready again for sea, she left on gunnery trials on 30 May and landed her first aircraft—a Fairey Swordfish—on 2 June. After completing flying trials, she left for Nova Scotia on 12 June, with one of her Swordfish flying anti-submarine patrols en route. Leaving Nova Scotia for Britain on 14 June, she again suffered from engine problems which cast her adrift for three hours while they were repaired. She continued to suffer from engine problems crossing the Atlantic, and on 17 September a depth charge-armed Swordfish crashed into her island on landing. After 75 minutes, they managed to safely drop the charge overboard. Arriving at Greenock on 23 June, she entered dock for modifications and to lengthen her wooden flight deck. On 2 September, she took part in landing trials with a Fairey Fulmar and practised landings and takeoffs with other Fleet Air Arm aircraft in the following weeks and exercised in oiling her escort vessels. On 1 October, Biter arrived in Scapa Flow, where she was joined on 10 October by Avenger. Her first fighters arrived on 14 October; 15 Sea Hurricanes belonging to No. 800 Naval Air Squadron. These planes were Sea Hurricane IB's armed with twelve .303 in (7.7 mm) machine guns and ICs armed with four 20 mm cannons. The two escort carriers—joined by the fleet carrier Victorious—left for Greenock on 16 October to join the British forces taking part in the North Africa landings Operation Torch.

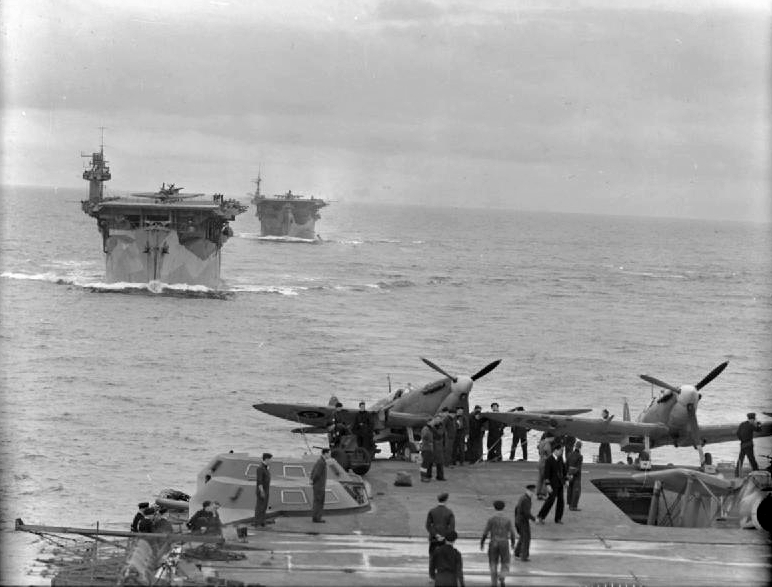
Biter and Avenger seen from the deck of Victorious, which has two Supermarine Seafires on board

=== Operation Torch ===
For the Torch landings, Biter was part of the covering force off Oran. The force comprised the battleship Rodney, the carriers Argus and Dasher, the light cruiser Delhi and nine destroyers. Flying operations began on 8 November 1942, but after a Sea Hurricane crashed into her bridge Biter was temporarily put out of action. One Sea Hurricane was shot down by a Vichy French Dewoitine D.520. Both Biter and Dasher were sent back to Gibraltar on 10 November. Biter joined a convoy for Greenock and arrived without incident on 19 November and went to Dundee for an overhaul. In February 1943, Biter joined Argus and her destroyer escorts on an anti-submarine exercise and then left for Iceland on 13 April accompanied by the destroyers Obdurate and Opportune arriving on 17 April. Along with HMS Pathfinder these ships formed 5th Support Group, commanded by Captain Conolly Abel-Smith.

=== Convoy ONS 4 ===
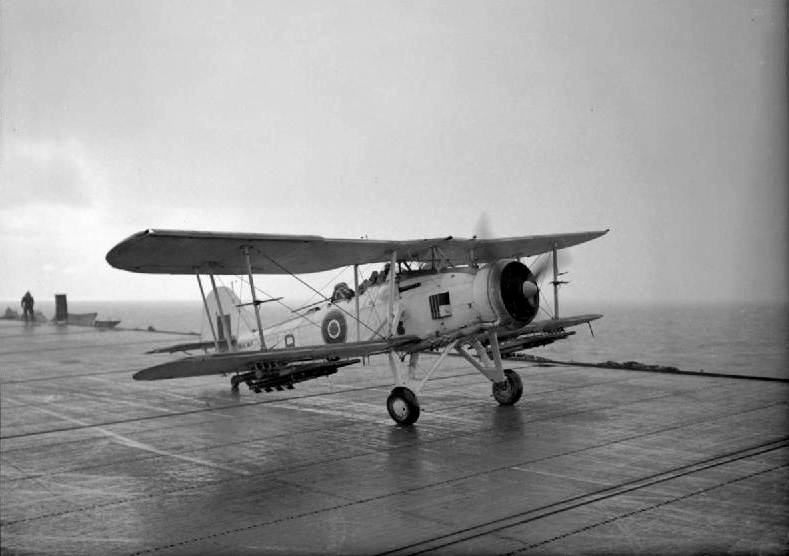
Fairey Swordfish taking off from an escort carrier

Biter had taken aboard No. 811 Naval Air Squadron under Lieutenant-Commander A.J.B Forde. This was a composite squadron equipped with nine Fairey Swordfish and three Grumman Martlets. On 21 April, Biter departed Iceland with convoy ONS 4 bound for Argentia. Captain Abel-Smith had decided to shadow the convoy from a distance believing this would provide them with greater opportunities to engage shadowing U-boats. Two Swordfish were kept at immediate readiness to take off and engage any submarine sightings. On 23 April, one of the patrolling Swordfish sighted a U-boat on the surface but it had dived before they got into an attacking position. That same afternoon, another U-boat was sighted by the convoy; they signalled Biter, which was 50 mi (43 nmi; 80 km) away. By the time the lone Swordfish dispatched had arrived, the U-boat (U-191) had been sunk by HMS Hesperus. Biter kept up her anti-submarine patrols over the next days and on 25 April, the radar operator on Biter reported a submarine contact. The destroyer dispatched to investigate could not find anything, then at 16:25 a Swordfish sighted a U-boat on the surface only 8 mi (7.0 nmi; 13 km) from Biter. Dropping two depth charges the Swordfish reported the sighting and another Swordfish and HMS Pathfinder were sent to assist. Pathfinder followed up the Swordfish attack with depth charges of her own, and at 18:40 U-203 surfaced and was abandoned by her crew. The convoy safely reached Argentia on 19 April without any loss but had sunk two U-boats.

=== Convoy HX 237 ===
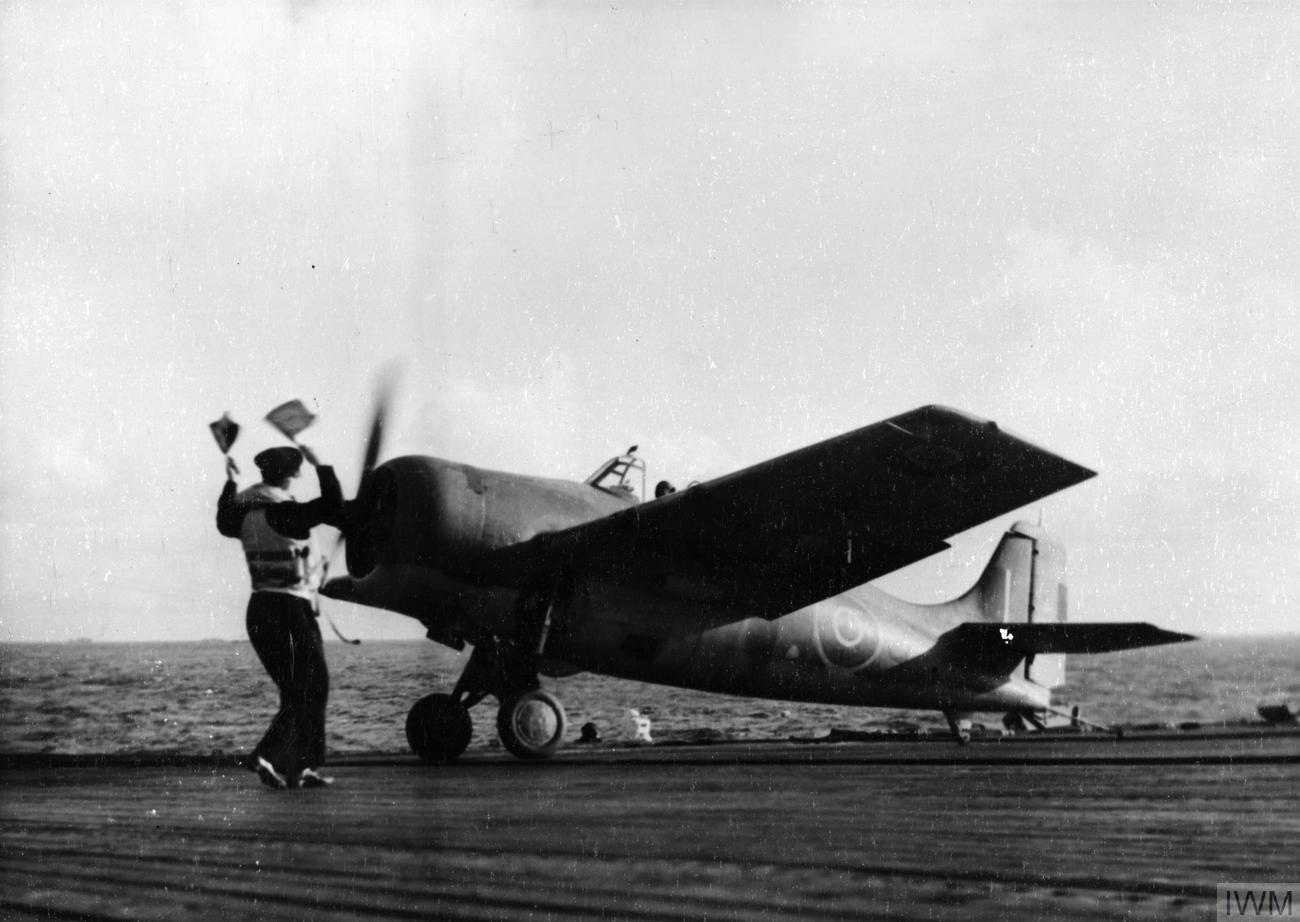
Grumman Martlet landing on board

Biter and her destroyers left Argentia on 5 May to join the home bound convoy HX 237, which was escorted by 2nd Canadian Escort Group. At first Abel Smith refused to place his support group in the convoy but was subsequently ordered to do so by the Admiralty. Fog prevented any flying until 07:30 on 7 May, when two Swordfish took off and located the convoy and provided an anti-submarine patrol. The carrier and escorts arrived an hour later. Two Martlets which until now had been idle took part in a patrol but lost the convoy and had to ditch beside a straggling merchant ship which rescued the crews. Ordered to close with the convoy by the Commander-in Chief (C-in-C) Western Approaches bad weather prevented any flying until after 16:00 on 10 May. The Swordfish responded to a sighting of a U-boat on the surface dropping two depth charges but was hit by anti-aircraft fire from the submarine. A second Swordfish had taken off to assist but could not find the U-boat or the convoy in the bad weather and was forced to ditch beside a straggling merchant ship. On 11 May, a Swordfish engaged another U-boat on the surface which initially fought back with her guns but was eventually forced to dive. The next morning, the patrolling Swordfish reported a U-boat sighting and was never heard from again. It was because of these last engagements that aircraft were ordered to fly in pairs, they were forbidden to fight it out with surfaced submarines and only to attack if it was diving. That afternoon a Swordfish sighted and attacked a U-boat diving only 6 mi (5.2 nmi; 9.7 km) from the convoy. The same U-boat, U-89, was located and sunk by two of the escorts, HMS Broadway, a Town-class destroyer, and HMS Lagan, a River-class frigate. On 13 May, the convoy had come within range of RAF Coastal Command Consolidated Liberators and Short Sunderlands. Two Swordfish took off at dawn and discovered two surfaced U-boats, which were attacked by a patrolling Sunderland of No.423 Squadron RCAF from RAF Castle Archdale. Another U-boat was located by a Swordfish at 09:00 and attacked as she was diving with no visible effect. Two U-boats were engaged by aircraft and escorts and sunk; these were U-456, sunk by HMS Opportune and a Liberator of No. 86 Squadron from RAF Aldergrove, and HMS Lagan, and U-753, sunk by the Flower-class corvette HMCS Drumheller and HMS Lagan.

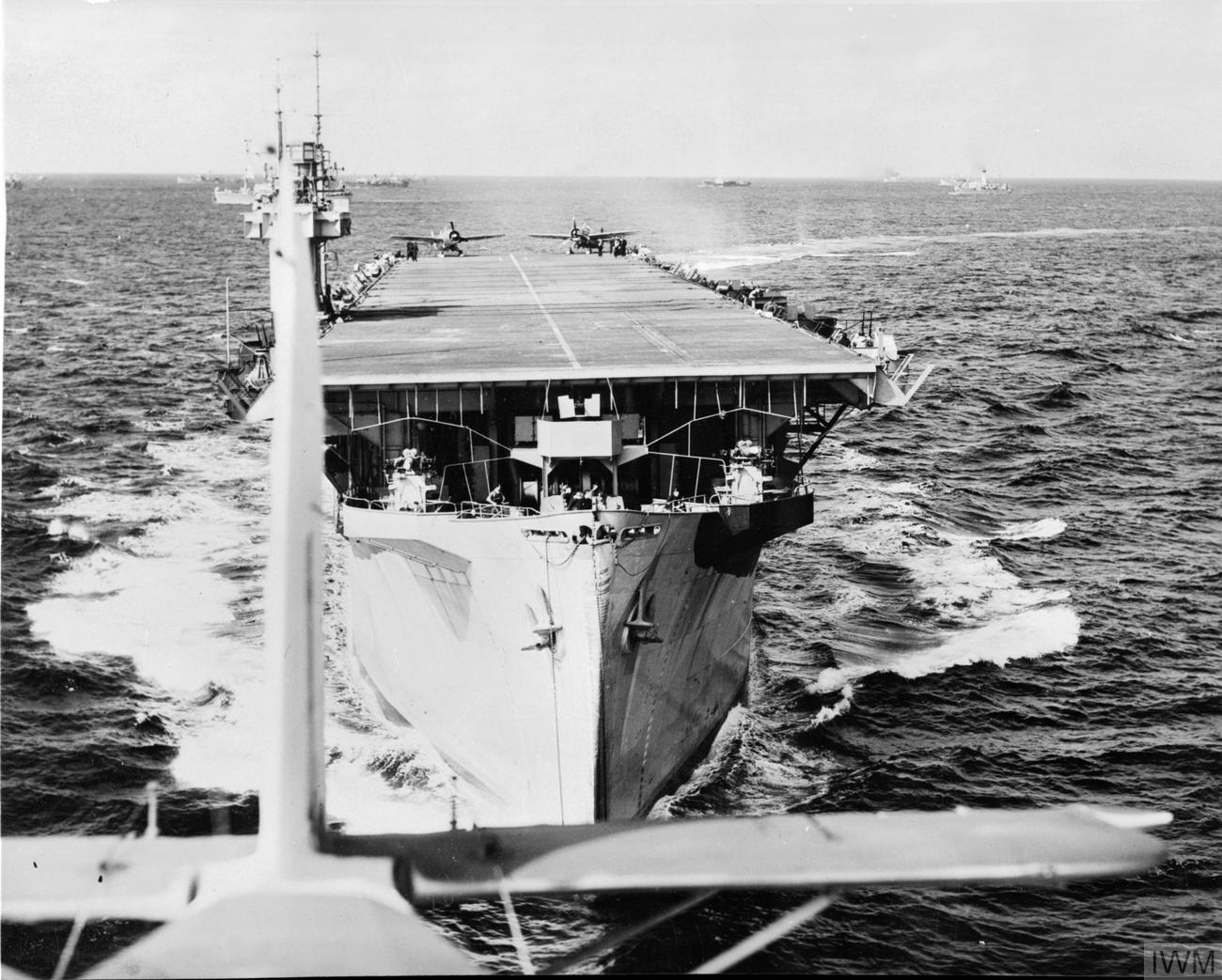
View of the flight deck from a Swordfish that has just taken off

=== Convoy SC 129 ===
With HX 237 now under land-based aircraft cover, the C-in-C Western Approaches ordered Biter and her escorts 200 mi (170 nmi; 320 km) south, where the eastbound convoy SC 129 was being threatened by a gathering wolfpack. On 15 May, light winds over the flight deck, and the inability of the Swordfish to use the catapult launch rail, limited their bomb load to two 40 lb (18 kg) bombs. Just before they closed on the convoy a Swordfish attacked a surfaced U-boat. The two bombs caused no damage to the submarine which returned fire, damaging the plane and wounding the air observer. Their relief shadowed the submarine until it dived when it carried out another unsuccessful attack. At 13:45, Biter closed with the convoy and commenced anti-submarine patrols. The convoy reached Britain on 16 May without any loss, and Biter was ordered to the Clyde. As a result of Biter′s experiences on these early convoys, the complement of aircraft carried was increased to 15 bombers and six fighters, with a 50% increase in air crews. Homing beacons were to be fitted to all carriers together with a Type 237 blind approach beam system for use in poor visibility.

=== Convoy HX 265 ===
On 19 October 1943, Biter with six Swordfish and six Martlets of No. 811 Naval Air Squadron on board left the Clyde to join the westbound convoy ON 207 which arrived at Argentia untroubled on 5 November. They left Argentia on 7 November to support convoy HX 265. Biter was the lead ship in the 5th Support Group, with the destroyers Pathfinder, Opportune and Obdurate. They, together with the 7th Escort Group, were tasked to sail 60 mi (52 nmi; 97 km) and 120 mi (100 nmi; 190 km) respectively ahead of the convoy. The intention was they would detect the two large concentrations of U-boats, that were known to be waiting for the next eastbound convoy. Aircraft from Biter made several U-boat sightings but did not sink any; one was reported as probably being damaged on 10 November. On 16 November a Swordfish coming in to land crashed into the sea behind Biter. The force of the crash released the plane's homing torpedo which detonated on the carrier's rudder. The explosion damaged the steering, rudder assembly and some hull plates below the waterline. Once she reached Britain, it took four weeks to repair the damage.

== French service ==
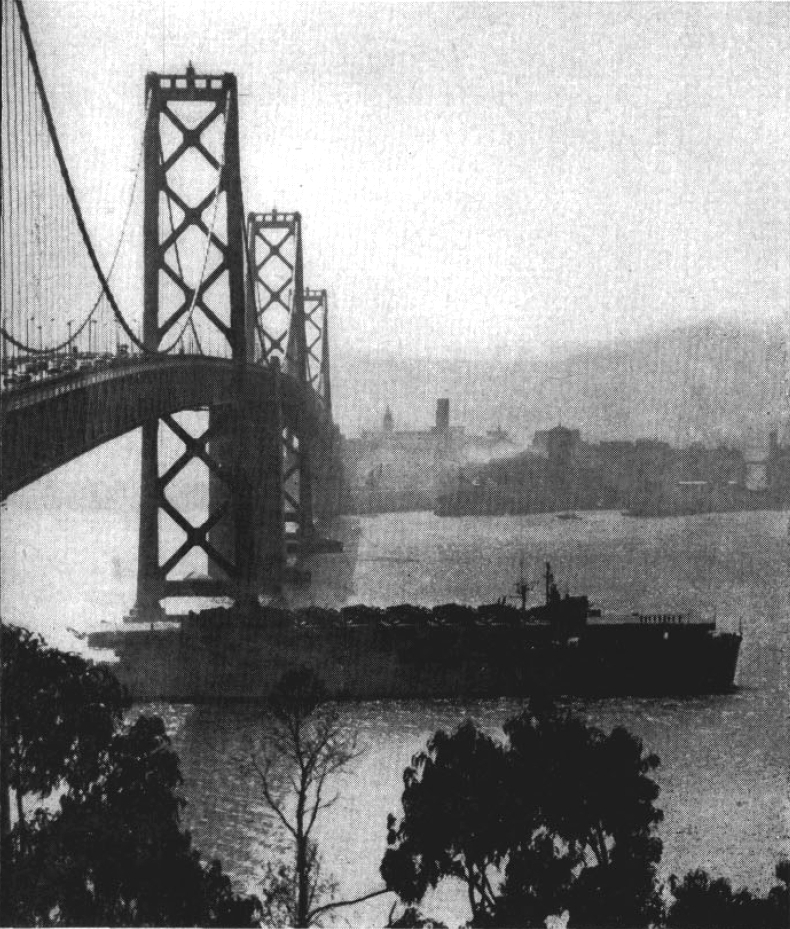
Dixmude leaving San Francisco, 1952

Biter was returned to the US Navy on 9 April 1945. She underwent a refit and was lent to the French Navy, where she was renamed Dixmude. The Flotille 3FB equipped with Douglas Dauntless dive bombers served on the ship between 1945 and 1949 during several campaigns in French Indochina. On 24 January 1951 she was removed from the US Navy register and disarmed during her next refit between 1951 and 1953. She then became an accommodation ship until 1965, when she was returned to the US Navy, who sank her as a target ship on June 16, 1966, in a 6th Fleet exercise, Exercise Deep Six.

== Notes ==
=== Bibliography ===
- Cocker, Maurice (2008). Aircraft-Carrying Ships of the Royal Navy. Stroud, Gloucestershire: The History Press. ISBN 978-0-7524-4633-2.
- Moulin, Jean (1998). Les porte-avions Dixmude et Arromanches. Nantes: Marines édition. ISBN 2-909-675-39-4.
- Poolman, Kenneth (1972). Escort Carrier 1941–1945. London: Ian Allan. ISBN 0-7110-0273-8.
- Tillman, Barrett (1998). SBD Dauntless Units of World War 2, Issue 10 of Osprey Combat Aircraft. Oxford: Osprey Publishing. ISBN 978-1-85532-732-0.
