= HMS Itchen (K227) =

1942 River-class frigate of the Royal Navy

History

United Kingdom
- Name: Itchen
- Namesake: River Itchen, Hampshire
- Builder: Fleming & Ferguson Ltd., Paisley
- Laid down: 14 July 1941
- Launched: 29 July 1942
- Commissioned: 28 December 1942
- Fate: Sunk on 23 September 1943 at 53°25′N 39°42′W

General characteristics
- Class & type: River-class frigate
- Displacement: 1,370 long tons (1,390 t); 1,830 long tons (1,860 t) (deep load)
- Length: 283 ft (86.26 m) p/p; 301.25 ft (91.82 m)o/a
- Beam: 36.5 ft (11.13 m)
- Draught: 9 ft (2.74 m); 13 ft (3.96 m) (deep load)
- Propulsion: 2 × Admiralty 3-drum boilers, 2 shafts, reciprocating vertical triple expansion, 5,500 ihp (4,100 kW)
- Speed: 20 knots (37.0 km/h)
- Range: 440 long tons (450 t; 490 short tons) oil fuel; 7,200 nautical miles (13,334 km) at 12 knots (22.2 km/h)
- Complement: 107
- Armament: 2 × QF 4-inch (102 mm) Mk.XIX guns, single mounts CP Mk.XXIII; up to 10 × QF 20 mm Oerlikon AA guns on twin mounts Mk.V and single mounts Mk.III; 1 × Hedgehog 24 spigot A/S projector; up to 150 depth charges

HMS Itchen (K227) was a River-class frigate of the Royal Navy (RN). Itchen was built to the RN's specifications as a Group I River-class frigate. She served in the North Atlantic during World War II.

As a River-class frigate, Itchen was one of 151 frigates launched between 1941 and 1944 for use as anti-submarine convoy escorts, named after rivers in the United Kingdom. The ships were designed by naval engineer William Reed, of Smith's Dock Company of South Bank-on-Tees, to have the endurance and anti-submarine capabilities of the Black Swan-class sloops, while being quick and cheap to build in civil dockyards using the machinery (e.g. reciprocating steam engines instead of turbines) and construction techniques pioneered in the building of the Flower-class corvettes. Its purpose was to improve on the convoy escort classes in service with the Royal Navy at the time, including the Flower class.

After commissioning in December 1942, Itchen participated in anti-submarine warfare exercises off Tobermory, Mull and Lough Foyle until mid-September 1943 where she was assigned as convoy escort.

On 19 September 1943, Itchen was involved in the U-boat attack on Convoys ONS 18/ON 202. At 21:51 on 20 September, HMCS St. Croix took three hits from U-305 in the stern and sunk, with 81 survivors being picked up by Itchen. During this, at 22:53 on 20 September, the German submarine U-305 fired a torpedo at Itchen but missed and HMS Polyanthus was sunk screening the rescue. At 02:01 on the morning of 23 September, U-666 fired a torpedo at Itchen which hit the ship after 70 seconds. The frigate blew up with the loss of 230 lives and 3 survivors. These ships were some of the first victims of the newly developed GNAT torpedo. The survivors were picked up by SS Wisła.
