= USS McCook (DD-252) =

Clemson-class destroyer

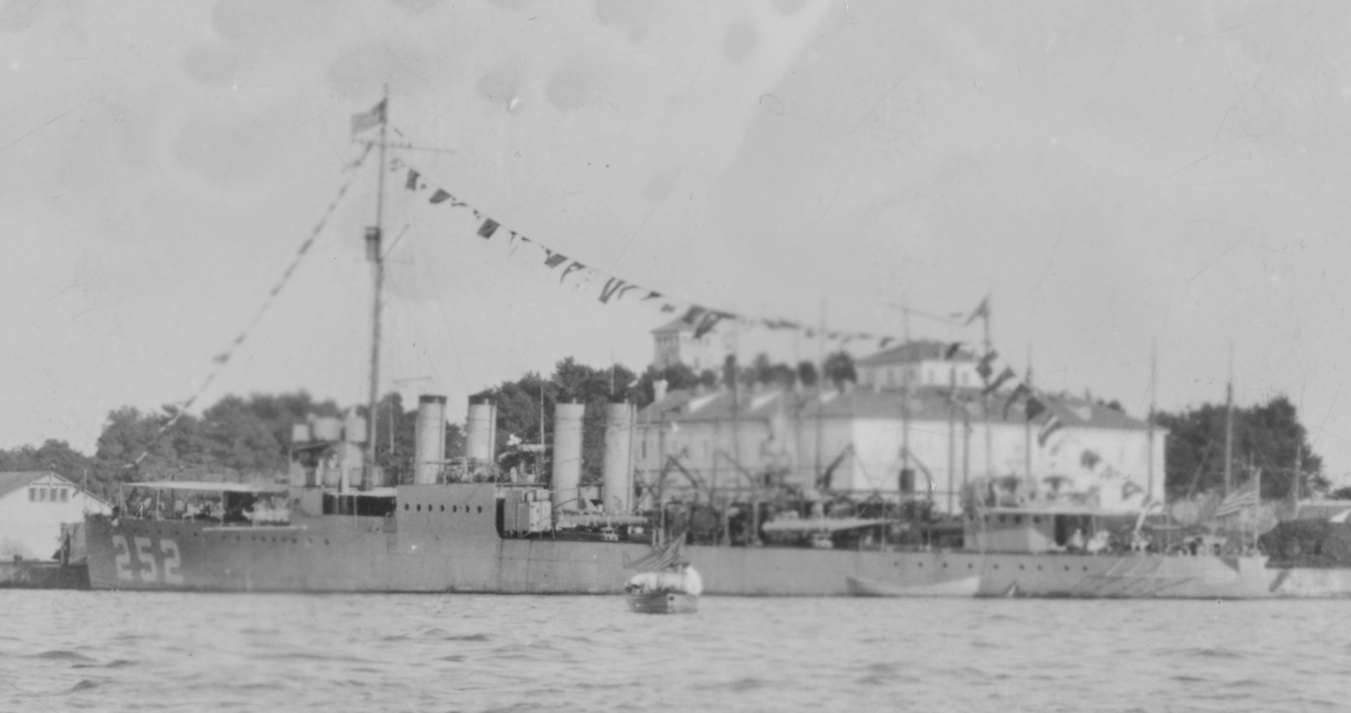
- USS McCook

History

United States
- Name: USS McCook
- Namesake: Roderick S. McCook
- Builder: Bethlehem Shipbuilding Corporation, Fore River Shipyard, Quincy
- Laid down: 10 September 1918
- Launched: 31 January 1919
- Commissioned: 30 April 1919
- Decommissioned: 24 September 1940
- Stricken: 8 January 1941
- Identification: DD-252
- Fate: Transferred to the United Kingdom then Canada, 24 September 1940

Canada
- Name: HMCS St. Croix
- Namesake: St. Croix River
- Acquired: 24 September 1940
- Identification: I81
- Honours and awards: Atlantic 1940-43
- Fate: Torpedoed and sunk, 20 September 1943

General characteristics
- Class & type: Clemson-class destroyer
- Displacement: 1,190 tons (1,209 t)
- Length: 314 ft 5 in (95.83 m)
- Beam: 31 ft 8 in (9.65 m)
- Draft: 9 ft 3 in (2.82 m)
- Propulsion: 26,500 shp (19,800 kW); Geared turbines; 2 screws
- Speed: 35 kn (65 km/h; 40 mph)
- Range: 4,900 nmi (9,100 km; 5,600 mi) at 15 kn (28 km/h; 17 mph)
- Complement: 120 officers and enlisted
- Armament: 4 x 4 in (102 mm) guns; 2 x 3 in (76 mm) guns; 12 x 21 in (533 mm) torpedo tubes

The first USS McCook (DD-252) was a Clemson-class destroyer in the United States Navy. Entering service in 1919, the ship had a brief active life before being placed in the reserve fleet. Reactivated for World War II, the ship was transferred to the Royal Navy and then to the Royal Canadian Navy and renamed HMCS St. Croix. Assigned as a convoy escort in the Battle of the Atlantic, St. Croix was torpedoed and sunk on 20 September 1943.

== Design and description ==
The Clemson class were the second class of "liberty destroyers" designed and built for the United States Navy. After the entry of the US into World War I, the United States Navy immediately required many escort ships. One of the classes given the moniker "flush deck destroyers", they were basically a repeat Wickes class with increased fuel storage for greater range. They also had increased anti-submarine warfare armament in response to criticisms of the Wickes class. The destroyer measured 310 feet 0 inches (94.5 m) long at the waterline and 314 feet 0 inches (95.7 m) overall with a beam of 30 feet 10 inches (9.4 m) and a draft of 9 feet 10 inches (3.0 m). The vessel had a standard displacement of 1,090 long tons (1,110 t) and were 1,310 long tons (1,330 t) at full load.

The destroyers was powered by steam provided by four White-Forster boilers to a pair of Westinghouse geared turbines. They drove two screws and was rated at 27,000 horsepower (20,000 kW). The vessel had a maximum speed in excess of 35 knots (65 km/h; 40 mph). They had storage for 400 long tons (410 t) of fuel oil, with a range of 2,500 nautical miles (4,600 km; 2,900 mi) at 20 knots (37 km/h; 23 mph).

Their improved armament reflected designs by British and German navies. The Clemson class was initially armed with four 4"/50 caliber guns; one situated on the forecastle, two on the superstructure deck amidships and one on the quarterdeck. The quarterdeck gun was later moved to the aft deck superstructure to make room for depth charge roller tracks. The 4"/50 guns had limited elevation and could not fire at aircraft. A 3"/23 caliber gun was installed for anti-aircraft warfare defense, along with two .50 caliber machine guns. The mainmast was shortened to improve the field of fire for the 3-inch gun. Mk 6 and Mk 9 depth charges were equipped in US service and were deployed via the aforementioned roller tracks or "K" or "Y" guns. The destroyers also mounted twelve torpedo tubes in four triple mounts capable of firing 21-inch (533 mm) torpedoes. The tube mounts were sited amidships between the superstructures. The destroyers carried no spare torpedoes.

== Construction and career ==
=== United States Navy service ===
The destroyer was laid down on 10 September 1918 by Bethlehem Shipbuilding at their yard in Quincy, Massachusetts, with the yard number 332. Named for Roderick S. McCook, the ship was launched on 31 January 1919, sponsored by Mrs. Henry C. Dinger. McCook was commissioned on 30 April 1919.

Following a period performing shakedown training, McCook was assigned to Destroyer Force, Atlantic Fleet. She operated along the east coast of the United States until decommissioning at Philadelphia on 30 June 1922. McCook remained in the Atlantic Reserve Fleet until recommissioned on 18 December 1939. The next year McCook was designated for exchange under the Destroyers for Bases Agreement with the United Kingdom.

=== Transfer to the UK ===
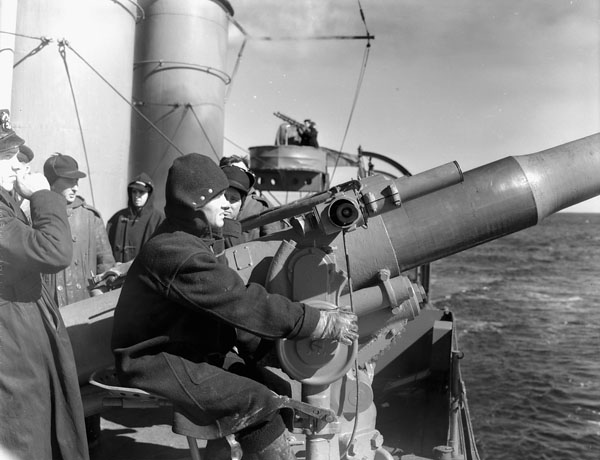
Crew manning a 4-inch gun off Halifax in March 1941

By 1940, the United Kingdom and the Commonwealth nations were fighting the Axis powers alone after the fall of France. The convoy route between North America and the United Kingdom was under attack by German U-boats and required protection, but the British lacked adequate ships to defend the shipping lanes. That year, the US offered 50 "flush deck destroyers" to the UK in exchange for leases to British bases around the world. In September, the deal was sealed and 50 vessels of the Clemson and Wickes classes were transferred to the UK. Renamed the Town class by the British, their new names were chosen from towns with names common to both nations.

After entering British service, the destroyers were modified with British radar, asdic and depth charge throwers. Two of the torpedo tube mounts were removed to make space for an Oerlikon 20 mm cannon, the aft 4-inch gun was replaced by a British 12-pounder gun and Type 273 radar was installed. Two boilers were removed and fuel storage was increased to improve range. The destroyer's final layout was three 20 mm Oerlikon cannon, one 3-inch gun, two .50 caliber machine guns, depth charge roller racks, one 21-inch torpedo tube mount sited on the deck centreline and the bridge area was revamped to make room for the new electronic equipment.

Steaming to Halifax, Nova Scotia, McCook arrived on 20 September 1940. Decommissioned on 24 September by the United States Navy, the destroyer was transferred to the United Kingdom on the same date, but due to manpower shortages in the Royal Navy, she was retransferred immediately to the Royal Canadian Navy and commissioned as HMCS St. Croix (I81). Following the Canadian practice of naming destroyers after Canadian rivers (but with deference to the U.S. origin), St. Croix was named after the St. Croix River forming the border between Maine and New Brunswick.

=== Royal Canadian Navy service ===
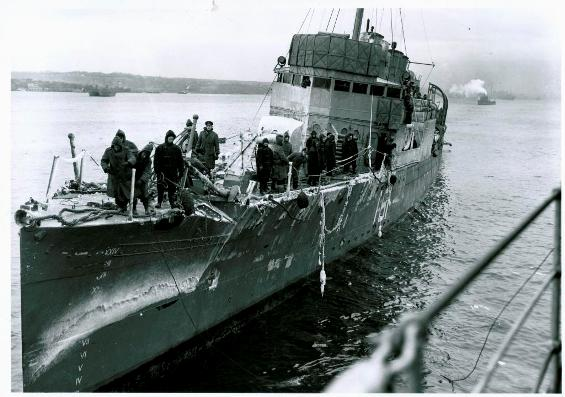
Storm damage to HMCS St. Croix

The destroyer sailed for the United Kingdom on 30 November via St. John's, Newfoundland but encountered a hurricane en route and was forced to return to Canada. HMCS St. Croix arrived at Halifax on 18 December and underwent repairs which kept the destroyer inactive until March 1941. On 14 March 1941 St. Croix assumed local escort and patrol duties in Canadian waters. At the end of August she joined the Newfoundland Escort Force and plied between St. John's and Reykjavík, Iceland. St. Croix underwent a six-month refit at Saint John, New Brunswick, returning to service in May 1942. By May 1942 the Newfoundland Escort Force had been renamed the Mid-Ocean Escort Force and its range extended to Londonderry Port.

St. Croix sank the U-90 on 24 July 1942, which, with other U-boats, had attacked her convoy (ON 113) on 23 July, sinking two merchant vessels and damaging a third. On the return voyage, Convoy ON 127 was attacked by 13 U-boats. Between 10 September and 14 September eleven merchant ships and one destroyer were lost.

En route from Londonderry Port to Gibraltar on 4 March 1943 with convoy KMS 10, she assisted the corvette HMCS Shediac in the sinking of U-87 some 200 miles (320 km) off the Iberian coast.

With the addition of air escort to convoy defense in 1943, U-boat tolls in the North Atlantic diminished and many of the boats were withdrawn during the summer. In the fall, however, Germany began a new U-boat offensive. On 16 September, St. Croix, then on her first patrol with an offensive striking group in the Bay of Biscay, went to the aid of convoy ONS 18, followed by ON 202, both heavily beset by a wolfpack. The defense of these convoys resulted in a long-running battle with losses to both sides. The convoys lost three escorts and six merchantmen, with two escorts damaged. The wolfpack lost three U-boats.

St. Croix was the first escort to be sunk, taking three hits from U-305 in the stern on 20 September. HMS Polyanthus was sunk by U-952 as she came up to screen HMS Itchen's rescue operations. Itchen, forced to retire that evening, returned the next morning and picked up 81 survivors from St. Croix and one from Polyanthus. The following day, 22 September, Itchen herself was torpedoed. Only three men were rescued, two from Itchen, one from St. Croix.

SS Wisła was involved in picking up the survivors.

=== Trans-Atlantic convoys escorted ===
Convoy	Escort Group	Dates	Notes
HX 129		27–28 May 1941	Newfoundland to Iceland
SC 33		1–3 June 1941	Newfoundland to Iceland
HX 133		17–20 June 1941	Newfoundland to Iceland
HX 135		26–29 June 1941	Newfoundland to Iceland
HX 138		11–15 July 1941	Newfoundland to Iceland
SC 41		28 Aug-5 Sept 1941	Newfoundland to Iceland
SC 42		12-17 Sept 1941	Newfoundland to Iceland
ON 17		19-21 Sept 1941	Iceland to Newfoundland
ON 19		28 Sept-4 Oct 1941	Iceland shuttle
SC 50		19-26 Oct 1941	Newfoundland to Iceland
ON 32		6-14 Nov 1941	Iceland to Newfoundland
HX 189	MOEF group C1	14 May 1942	Newfoundland
SC 84	MOEF group C2	17–21 May 1942	Newfoundland to Iceland
SC 89	MOEF group C2	28 June-10 July 1942	Newfoundland to Northern Ireland
ON 113	MOEF group C2	18–26 July 1942	Northern Ireland to Newfoundland
SC 96	MOEF group C4	15-26 Aug 1942	Newfoundland to Northern Ireland
Convoy ON 127	MOEF group C4	5-14 Sept 1942	Northern Ireland to Newfoundland
SC 101	MOEF group C4	23 Sept-3 Oct 1942	Newfoundland to Northern Ireland
ON 137	MOEF group C4	12-19 Oct 1942	Northern Ireland to Newfoundland
HX 222	MOEF group C1	11-22 Jan 1943	Newfoundland to Northern Ireland
KMS 10	MOEF group C1	28 Feb-8 March 1943	Firth of Clyde to Mediterranean Sea
MKS 9	MOEF group C1	8–18 March 1943	Mediterranean Sea to Firth of Clyde
ONS 2	MOEF group C1	5–14 April 1943	Northern Ireland to Newfoundland
SC 127	MOEF group C1	20 April-2 May 1943	Newfoundland to Northern Ireland
ON 184	MOEF group C1	16–25 May 1943	Northern Ireland to Newfoundland
HX 250	Support Group 9	5-11 Aug 1943	
HX 256	Support Group 9	19 Sept 1943	
Convoys ONS 18/ON 202	Support Group 9	19-20 Sept 1943	Hit by torpedoes from U-305 and sunk.

== Sources ==
- Adcock, Al (2003). US Flush Deck Destroyers in Action. Warships Number 19. Carrollton, Texas: Squadron/Signal Publications. ISBN 0-89747-460-0.
- "McCook I (Destroyer No. 252)". Dictionary of American Naval Fighting Ships. Navy Department, Naval History and Heritage Command.
- Lardas, Mark (2018). US Flush-Deck Destroyers 1916–45 Caldwell, Wickes and Clemson Classes. New Vanguard. Oxford, UK: Osprey Publishing. ISBN 978-1-472-81997-0.
- Macpherson, Ken & Barrie, Ron (2002). The Ships of Canada's Naval Forces 1910–2002 (Third ed.). St. Catharines, Ontario: Vanwell Publishing. ISBN 1-55125-072-1.
- Milner, Marc (1985). North Atlantic Run. Naval Institute Press. ISBN 0-87021-450-0.
- "McCook (6107749)". Miramar Ship Index.
