= HMCS Drumheller =

Flower-class corvette

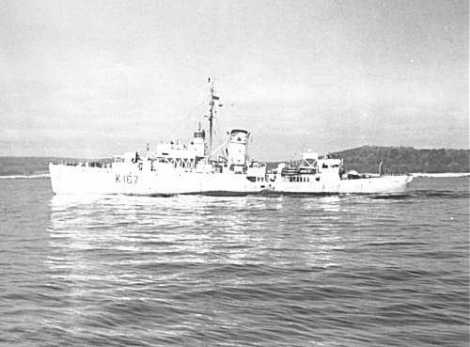
- HMCS Drumheller

History

Canada
- Name: Drumheller
- Namesake: Drumheller, Alberta
- Ordered: 1 February 1940
- Builder: Collingwood Shipyards Ltd. Collingwood
- Laid down: 4 December 1940
- Launched: 5 July 1941
- Commissioned: 13 September 1941
- Decommissioned: 11 July 1945
- Identification: Pennant number: K167
- Honours and awards: Atlantic 1941-45; Normandy 1944; English Channel 1944-45;
- Fate: Scrapped 1949

General characteristics
- Class & type: Flower-class corvette (original)
- Displacement: 925 long tons (940 t; 1,036 short tons)
- Length: 205 ft (62.48 m)o/a
- Beam: 33 ft (10.06 m)
- Draught: 11.5 ft (3.51 m)
- Propulsion: single shaft; 2 × fire tube Scotch boilers; 1 × 4-cycle triple-expansion reciprocating steam engine; 2,750 ihp (2,050 kW)
- Speed: 16 knots (29.6 km/h)
- Range: 3,500 nautical miles (6,482 km) at 12 knots (22.2 km/h)
- Complement: 85
- Sensors & processing systems: 1 × SW1C or 2C radar; 1 × Type 123A or Type 127DV sonar
- Armament: 1 × BL 4 in (102 mm) Mk.IX single gun; 2 × .50 cal machine gun (twin); 2 × Lewis .303 cal machine gun (twin); 2 × Mk.II depth charge throwers; 2 × Depth charge rails with 40 depth charges; originally fitted with minesweeping gear, later removed

HMCS Drumheller was a Flower-class corvette that served with the Royal Canadian Navy during the Second World War. She served in several theatres, including the Battle of the Atlantic as an ocean escort. She was named for Drumheller, Alberta.

== Background ==
Flower-class corvettes like Drumheller serving with the Royal Canadian Navy during the Second World War were different from earlier and more traditional sail-driven corvettes. The "corvette" designation was created by the French as a class of small warships; the Royal Navy borrowed the term for a period but discontinued its use in 1877. During the hurried preparations for war in the late 1930s, Winston Churchill reactivated the corvette class, needing a name for smaller ships used in an escort capacity, in this case based on a whaling ship design. The generic name "flower" was used to designate the class of these ships, which – in the Royal Navy – were named after flowering plants.

Corvettes commissioned by the Royal Canadian Navy during the Second World War were named after communities for the most part, to better represent the people who took part in building them. This idea was put forth by Admiral Percy W. Nelles. Sponsors were commonly associated with the community for which the ship was named. Royal Navy corvettes were designed as open sea escorts, while Canadian corvettes were developed for coastal auxiliary roles which was exemplified by their minesweeping gear. Eventually the Canadian corvettes would be modified to allow them to perform better on the open seas.

== Construction ==
Drumheller was ordered 1 February 1940 as part of the 1939-1940 Flower-class building program. She was laid down by Collingwood Shipyards Ltd. in Collingwood, Ontario on 4 December 1940 and launched 5 July 1941. Drumheller was commissioned at Montreal on 13 September 1941. She underwent two major refits during her career. The first came after developing mechanical defects during an ocean crossing. This led to a spell in 1942 at Southampton refitting. The second refit that Drumheller underwent took place at New York from mid-November 1943 until mid-January 1944 where her fo'c'sle was extended.

== War service ==
After arrival at Halifax for workups, Drumheller was assigned to Sydney Force in November 1941. She was transferred to Newfoundland Command soon after and spent two months beginning in December 1941 as an ocean escort.

In February 1942, Drumheller began the "Newfie" - Derry run, one of the first Canadian ships to do so. While on a return trip to St. John's, Drumheller developed mechanical defects and was forced to return to the United Kingdom for repairs. After completion of the repairs, she was assigned to Tobermory, the escort ship training site, for workups. She resumed her ocean escort duties at the end of April.

In April 1942 after her return to active service, she was assigned to Mid-Ocean Escort Force (MOEF) escort group C-2 and served with it until April 1944. In May 1943 Drumheller as escort to Convoy HX 237 teamed with an RAF Sunderland and HMS Lagan to sink U-753. Also during this time Drumheller was involved in the severe battle surrounding Convoys ONS 18/ON 202 in September 1943 which lost six merchant ships and three escorts.

In April 1944, she was assigned to Western Approaches Command for invasion duties. She took part in the invasion of Normandy and afterwards, in September of that year, transferred to Portsmouth Command. After a short stay, Drumheller transferred one last time, this time to Nore Command in November 1944. She stayed with them until the end of the war, when in mid-May 1945, she was sent home to Canada. Drumheller was paid off 11 July 1945. The ship was sold for scrapping on 30 August 1946 and was broken up in Hamilton in 1949.
