= HMS Lagan =

River-class frigate of the Royal Navy

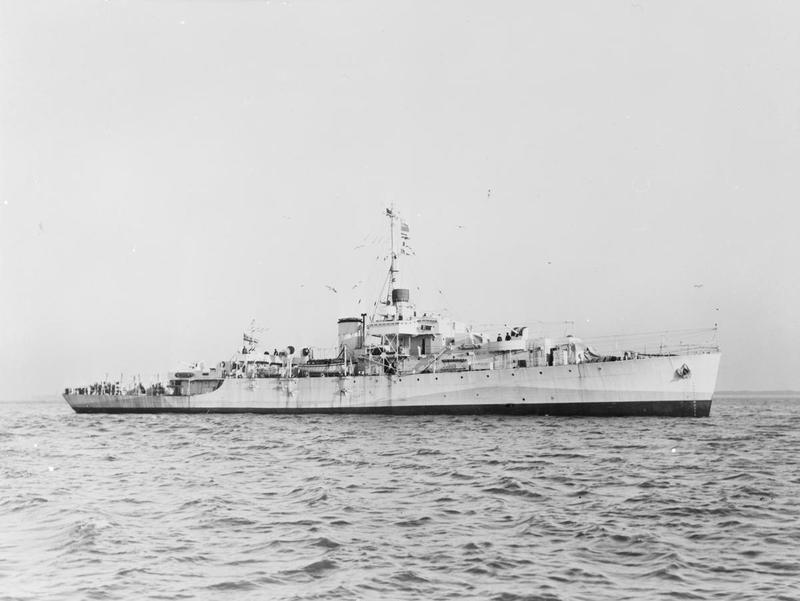
- Lagan in 1943.

History

United Kingdom
- Name: Lagan
- Namesake: River Lagan
- Builder: Smiths Dock Co., South Bank-on-Tees
- Laid down: 7 January 1942
- Launched: 28 July 1942
- Commissioned: 21 December 1942
- Fate: Badly damaged by U-270, 20 September 1943. Declared a loss on 24th, and sold for scrap in 1946

General characteristics
- Class & type: River-class frigate
- Displacement: 1,370 long tons (1,390 t); 1,830 long tons (1,860 t) (deep load)
- Length: 283 ft (86.26 m) p/p; 301.25 ft (91.82 m)o/a
- Beam: 36.5 ft (11.13 m)
- Draught: 9 ft (2.74 m); 13 ft (3.96 m) (deep load)
- Propulsion: 2 × Admiralty 3-drum boilers, 2 shafts, reciprocating vertical triple expansion, 5,500 ihp (4,100 kW)
- Speed: 20 knots (37.0 km/h)
- Range: 440 long tons (450 t; 490 short tons) oil fuel; 7,200 nautical miles (13,334 km) at 12 knots (22.2 km/h)
- Complement: 107
- Armament: 2 × QF 4-inch (102 mm) Mk.XIX guns, single mounts CP Mk.XXIII; up to 10 × QF 20 mm Oerlikon AA guns on twin mounts Mk.V and single mounts Mk.III; 1 × Hedgehog 24 spigot A/S projector; up to 150 depth charges

HMS Lagan (K259) was a River-class frigate of the Royal Navy (RN). Lagan was built to the RN's specifications as a Group II River-class frigate. She served in the North Atlantic during World War II.

As a River-class frigate, Lagan was one of 151 frigates launched between 1941 and 1944 for use as anti-submarine convoy escorts, named after rivers in the United Kingdom. The ships were designed by naval engineer William Reed, of Smith's Dock Company of South Bank-on-Tees, to have the endurance and anti-submarine capabilities of the Black Swan-class sloops, while being quick and cheap to build in civil dockyards using the machinery (e.g. reciprocating steam engines instead of turbines) and construction techniques pioneered in the building of the Flower-class corvettes. Its purpose was to improve on the convoy escort classes in service with the Royal Navy at the time, including the Flower class.

After commissioning in December 1942, Lagan served in convoy escort missions and participated in anti-submarine warfare exercises off Lough Foyle. On 12 May 1942, Lagan, with HMS Biter and HMS Broadway, sank the German submarine U-89. The next day, Lagan and HMCS Drumheller sank U-753.

Whilst Lagan was part of Convoy ON 202, she was attacked by U-270. At 04:57 on 20 September 1943, a GNAT torpedo struck the stern of Lagan, causing critical damage to the ship and 29 dead. She was towed by the tugboat HMS Destiny to Mersey, arriving on 24 September, where Lagan was declared a constructive total loss. The wreck was sold for scrap in Troon on 21 May 1946.
