= HMS Destiny (W 115) =

Favourite-class tugboat of the Royal Navy

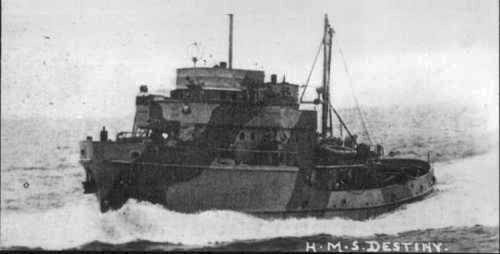

History

United Kingdom
- Name: HMS Destiny (W115)
- Builder: Defoe Shipbuilding Company, Bay City, Michigan
- Laid down: 10 April 1942
- Launched: 1 July 1942
- Commissioned: 30 July 1942
- Stricken: 8 May 1946
- Identification: IMO number: 5127413
- Fate: Returned to the United States Navy, 13 June 1946

General characteristics
- Type: Favourite class Tugboat
- Displacement: 835 tons full
- Length: 143 ft
- Beam: 33 ft 10 in (extreme)
- Draft: 13 ft 2 in (limiting)
- Propulsion: one General Motors Diesel-electric model 12-278A single Fairbanks Morse Main Reduction Gear Ship's Service Generators one Diesel-drive 60 kW 120 V D.C. one Diesel-drive 30 kW 120 V D.C. single propeller, 1,500shp
- Speed: 13 knots
- Complement: 45
- Armament: 1 x 3"/50 caliber gun 2 x single 20mm gun mounts

HMS Destiny (W 115) was a Favourite-class tugboat of the Royal Navy during World War II.

== Service history ==
Destiny was laid down on 10 April 1942 at Defoe Shipbuilding Company in Bay City, Michigan, as BAT-9, launched 1 July 1942 and commissioned into the Royal Navy under Lend-Lease on 30 July 1942. She served through World War II and was returned to the United States Navy in Subic Bay on 13 June 1946 and struck on 8 May 1946. On 6 January 1948, she was sold to Moller on 6 January 1948 and renamed Frosty Moller. In 1950, she was renamed Christine Moller and sold in 1951 to a Dutch owner and renamed Oceanus. In 1953, she was again sold and renamed Gee Zee. After a decade, she was resold to Greek owners and renamed Atlas. Renamed Atlas II in 1976, her final disposition is unknown.
