= HMCS Morden =

Flower-class corvette

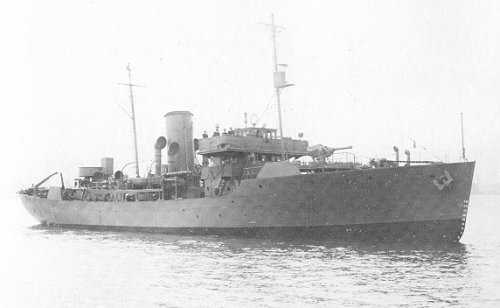
- HMCS Morden, 1941

History

Canada
- Name: Morden
- Namesake: Morden, Manitoba
- Ordered: 1 February 1940
- Builder: Port Arthur Shipbuilding Co., Port Arthur
- Laid down: 25 October 1940
- Launched: 5 May 1941
- Commissioned: 9 May 1941
- Out of service: paid off 29 June 1945
- Identification: Pennant number: K170
- Honours and awards: Atlantic 1941-45
- Fate: Scrapped 1946.

General characteristics
- Class & type: Flower-class corvette
- Displacement: 925 long tons (940 t; 1,036 short tons)
- Length: 205 ft (62.48 m)o/a
- Beam: 33 ft (10.06 m)
- Draught: 11.5 ft (3.51 m)
- Installed power: 2 × fire tube Scotch boilers; 1 × 4-cycle triple-expansion reciprocating steam engine; 2,750 ihp (2,050 kW)
- Propulsion: Single shaft
- Speed: 16 knots (30 km/h; 18 mph)
- Range: 3,500 nmi (6,482 km) at 12 knots (22 km/h; 14 mph)
- Complement: 85
- Sensors & processing systems: 1 × SW1C or 2C radar; 1 × Type 123A or Type 127DV sonar
- Armament: 1 × BL 4 in (102 mm) Mk.IX single gun; 2 × .50 cal machine gun (twin); 2 × Lewis .303 cal machine gun (twin); 2 × Mk.II depth charge throwers; 2 × depth charge rails with 40 depth charges

HMCS Morden was a Flower-class corvette that served with the Royal Canadian Navy during the Second World War. She fought primarily in the Battle of the Atlantic as an ocean escort.

== Background ==
The "corvette" designation was created by the French for classes of small warships; the Royal Navy borrowed the term for a period but discontinued its use in 1877. During the hurried preparations for war in the late 1930s, Winston Churchill reactivated the corvette class, needing a name for smaller ships used in an escort capacity, in this case based on a whaling ship design. The generic name "flower" was used to designate the class of these ships, which – in the Royal Navy – were named after flowering plants.

Morden is a city in the Pembina Valley region of southern Manitoba in Canada. (Corvettes commissioned by the Royal Canadian Navy during the Second World War were named after Canadian communities). Royal Navy corvettes were designed as open sea escorts, while Canadian corvettes were developed for coastal auxiliary roles which was exemplified by their minesweeping gear. Eventually the Canadian corvettes would be modified to allow them to perform better on the open seas.

== Construction ==
Morden was ordered on 1 February 1940 as part of the 1939-1940 Flower-class building program. She was laid down by Port Arthur Shipbuilding Co. at Port Arthur on 25 October 1940 and launched 5 May 1941. Morden was commissioned at Montreal on 6 September 1941.

During the war, Morden had four significant refits. Her first major refit took place at Southampton for a two-month refit beginning in November 1941 after escorting her first convoy. The second was a brief refit at Lunenburg, Nova Scotia in June 1943. Her third major refit took place at Derry from November 1943 until January 1944, during which her fo'c'sle was extended. Morden's final major refit was begun in December 1944 at Sydney and completed in May 1945 at Halifax.

== Service history ==
After arriving at Halifax for deployment, Morden was assigned to Newfoundland Command for one convoy in November 1941 before heading for a refit. In March 1942, after workups, she returned to duty as an ocean escort. It was a position she would keep continuously until the Fall 1943. Beginning in May 1942, Morden was assigned to Mid-Ocean Escort Force escort group C-2. On 1 September 1942, Morden sank U-756 in the North Atlantic about 440 nautical miles (810 km; 510 mi) west-south-west of Cape Farewell in position 57°41′N, 31°30′W. On 12 May 1943 she picked up 40 survivors from the Norwegian merchant Brand that was torpedoed and sunk in the North Atlantic by U-603.

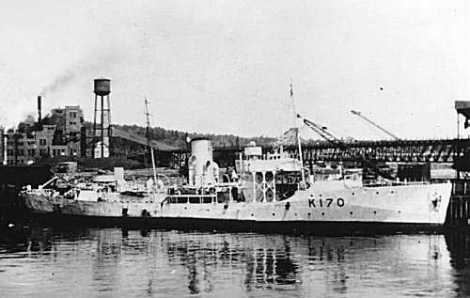
HMCS Morden at anchor.

Morden was assigned to the Royal Navy's escort group EG 9 in July 1943. While patrolling with EG 9 south of the Isles of Scilly, the group was ordered to reinforce Convoys ONS 18/ON 202 which was hard pressed by a U-boat wolfpack attack. During this battle the convoy lost six merchants and three escorts. On 23 September 1943 the French corvette Renoncule and Morden picked up survivors from the American merchant Steel Voyager that was torpedoed and sunk by U-952 in the North Atlantic. In October 1943 she returned to escort group C-2, who she would remain with until November 1944.

After returning from her final refit and working up in Bermuda, Morden joined the Western Local Escort Force escort group W-9. As a local escort, she took part in convoy HX 358, the final HX convoy of the war. She remained with this group until the end of the war.

Morden was paid off at Sorel, Quebec on 29 June 1945. She was sold for scrapping in November 1950 and broken up at Hamilton, Ontario.
