= SS Wisła (1928) =

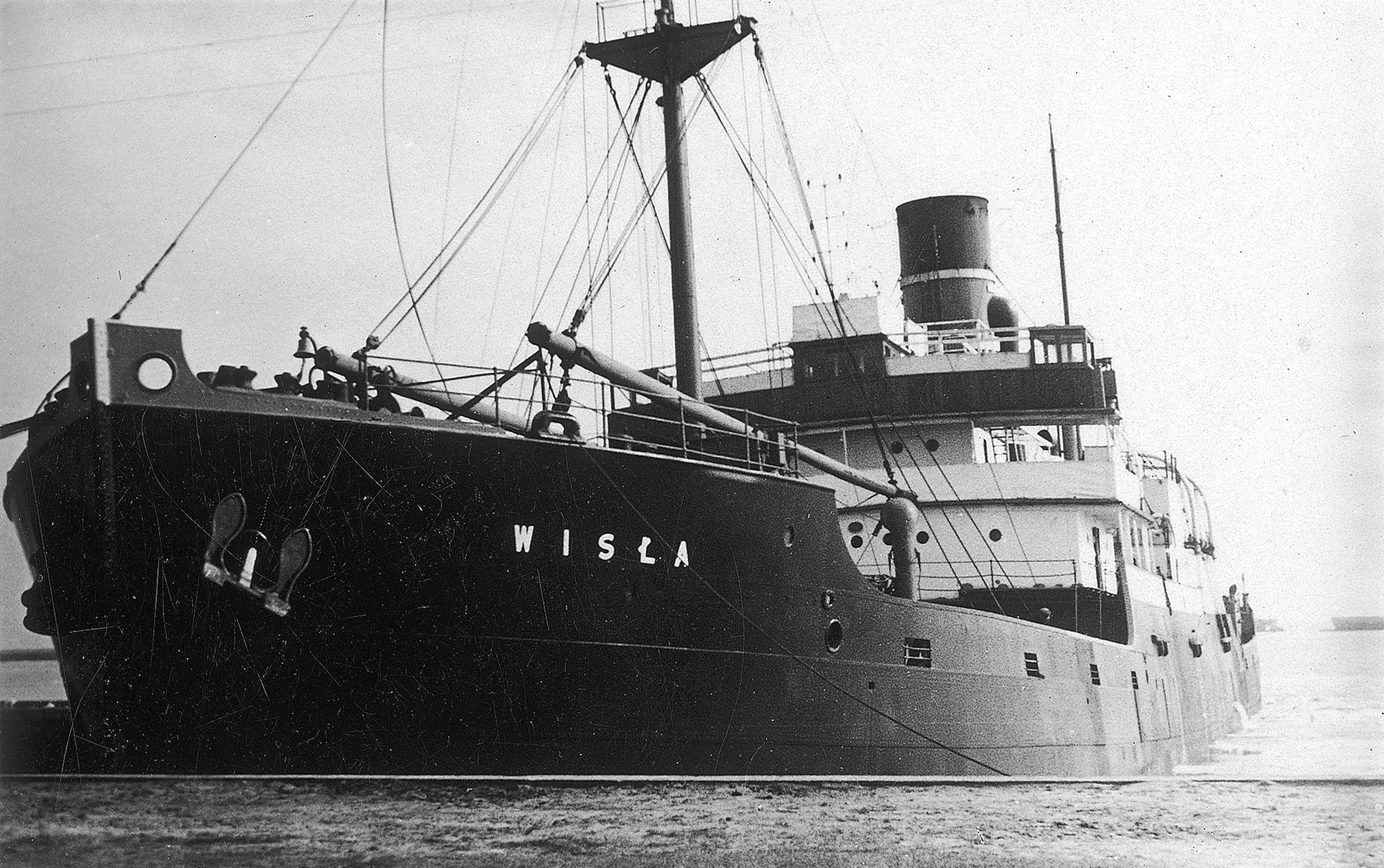
SS Wisła in 1946-48

SS Wisła was a 5,070 DWT bulk carrier that was built in 1928 by Craig, Taylor & Co. Ltd. shipyard, Stockton-on-Tees, United Kingdom for the Polish ship-owner "Żegluga Polska". She was serving for Polish shipowner as a bulk carrier until 1961 and then as a lighter. In December 1975 she was towed to Belgium to be scrapped.

In late September 1943, Wisła was involved in picking up the survivors of the U-boat attack on Convoys ONS 18/ON 202.
