= Convoys ONS 18/ON 202 =

Convoys during naval battles of the Second World War

- Part of Battle of the Atlantic/World War II
Date	19–23 September 1943
Location	North Atlantic
Result	Allied victory

Belligerents
Germany	United Kingdom; Canada

Commanders and leaders
Admiral Karl Dönitz	ONS 18: Comm: HC Forsyth; Escort:Cdr MB Evans ON 202: Comm: EO Cochrane; Escort:LtCdr PW Burnett

Strength
Leuthen: : 21 U-boats	ONS 18: 27 ships: 8 escorts: ON 202: 38 ships: 6 escort: SG 9: 5 warships

Casualties and losses
3 U-boats	6 ships: 3 warships

ONS 18 and ON 202 were North Atlantic convoys of the ONS/ON series which ran during the battle of the Atlantic in World War II. They were the subject of a major U-boat attack in September 1943, the first battle in the Kriegsmarine's autumn offensive, following the withdrawal from the North Atlantic route after Black May.

== Background ==
Following the defeats of May 1943, and the devastating losses incurred by the U-boat Arm (U-Bootwaffe, or UBW) Admiral Dönitz had withdrawn from attacks on the North Atlantic route while awaiting tactical and technical improvements. Chief among these was the T-5 acoustic torpedo, with which (it was planned) the convoy escorts could be attacked and eliminated, leaving the merchant ships defenceless. By September 1943 these were ready, and U-boat Control (Befehlshaber der Unterseeboote, BdU) dispatched a patrol group of 21 boats, code-named Leuthen, to renew the attack on the North Atlantic route.

== Ships involved ==
In September 1943 BdU had established the patrol line Leuthen of 21 U-boats south of Greenland; these were to intercept west-bound convoys as they were about to enter the Greenland Air Gap, where Allied aircraft were reckoned to be unable to operate due to the extreme range. Leuthen was to harry any convoy it encountered while crossing the gap, before breaking off to repeat the onslaught with the east-bound convoys.

On 12 September 1943 convoy ONS 18 left Liverpool bound for Halifax. Composed of 27 ships it was protected by B-3 Escort Group, comprising 2 destroyers, Escapade and Keppel, the frigate Towy ( Cdr MB Evans RN, the Senior Officer:Escort), and 5 corvettes; Narcissus, Orchis, Roselys, Lobelia and Renoncule. ONS 18 was also accompanied by the MAC carrier Empire MacAlpine.

When Western Approaches Command became aware of Leuthen, it was decided to reinforce ONS 18; the following convoy, ON 202 was ordered to close up, and a support group, SG 9, sent to join.

ON 202 had left Liverpool on 15 September, composed of 38 ships and escorted by Canadian escort group C-2, comprising 2 destroyers, Gatineau (commanded by Lt.Cdr PW Burnett RN, SOE) and Icarus; the frigate Lagan, and 3 corvettes; Drumheller, Kamloops and Polyanthus.

Support Group 9 comprised destroyer St Croix, frigate Itchen (Cdr CE Bridgman RN, SOE) and 3 corvettes, Chambly, Morden and Sackville.

Altogether the 65 ships were escorted by 19 warships, to face an attack from 21 U-boats.

== Action ==
On 19 September ONS 18 was sighted by U-270; after sending a sighting report she was authorized to attack. Closing in U-270 fired a T-5 acoustic torpedo at Lagan, damaging her stern, the first case of an Allied warship to be damaged by the new weapon. The escorts counter-attacked, but U-270 escaped, though Escapade was damaged by a misfire from her Hedgehog. Both Lagan and Escapade were forced to detach, returning to base under escort.

The Leuthen boats closed in during 19 September, but 2 were attacked by air patrols, which, since the introduction of a number of Very Long Range (VLR) Liberators during the summer, had been extended into the Air Gap. U-341 was attacked and sunk by a Liberator from 10 Squadron RCAF. U-338 was attacked by a Liberator of 120 Sqdn RAF which was credited with the kill; however post-war analysis showed that U-338 was only damaged by this, though was later engaged and sunk by the corvette Drumheller of C 2 group.

On the night of 19/20 several Leuthen boats were in contact; U-260 attacked, but gained no hits. U-238 fired on 2 ships, sinking one, Theodore Dwight Weld, and damaging another, Frederick Douglass. She fell out of the convoy, and was sunk later in the day by U-645.

On 20/21 a dozen boats were in contact, and 8 were able to attack. U-305 hit St Croix, which sank with the loss of 66 of her crew. U-952 hit Polyanthus, which exploded and sank, leaving 1 survivor. He, and 81 men from St Croix, were picked up by Itchen. U-386 was damaged by depth-charge attack and was forced to retire; U-603 was ordered to rendezvous, but was thwarted by air attacks.

Leuthen remained in contact, and on the night of 21/22 renewed the attack. U-377 attacked, claiming hits, but these were not confirmed; she was attacked and damaged by aircraft and retired. U-230 attacked, but again no hits were confirmed, she also was attacked by an unidentified escort and forced to retire. U-229 was attacked and destroyed, this being credited to Keppel, Evans' flagship. U-422 was damaged by air attack, but was able to continue.

On 23 September the convoys reached the Grand Banks area, where fog hindered visibility both of the air patrols and the attacking Leuthen boats. U-238 was able to penetrate the escort screen and sank 3 ships; Skjelbred, Oregon Express, and Fort Jemseg. U-666 torpedoed Itchen; she sank, leaving just 3 survivors from her own crew and those of Polyanthus and St Croix she was carrying. U-952 sank Steel Voyager and damaged James Gordon Bennett. U-758 attacked, but had no hits confirmed and was herself damaged by a depth-charge attack.

Poor visibility, fuel shortages, and fatigue now beset both U-boats and escorts, but BdU, believing the attack to have been a great success, ordered Leuthen to break off the attack.

Claims by the various boat amounted to 12 escorts and 9 ships sunk, and a further 2 ships damaged

Actual losses were 3 escorts and 6 ships, with another damaged, while 3 U-boats were destroyed with a further 3 damaged and forced to return to base.

Both convoys continued to their destinations, ONS 18 reaching Halifax on 29 September, while ON 202 arrived at New York on 1 October.

== Conclusion ==
Believing the new tactics and weapons to be a great success, BdU continued the offensive. Leuthen was disbanded, with 12 boats forming a new patrol line, Rossbach, joined by 9 boats from home bases to attack the next set of east-bound convoys.

The Admiralty were also encouraged by the result. Despite the losses, (which were serious), 90% of the ships had arrived safely. The losses, while serious, were no more grievous than during the battles of late 1942 and early 1943. Thus they were confident the escorts would be able to meet the challenge of the U-boat Arm's new weapons and tactics.

== Tables ==
=== Allied ships lost ===
Date	Name	Nationality	Casualties	GRT	Sunk by...
ONS 18	...	...	...	...	...
23 September 1943	Steel Voyager	United States	0	6,198	U-952
ON 202	...	...	...	...	...
19/20 September 1943	Theodore Dwight Weld	United States	33	7,176	U-238
20 September 1943	Frederick Douglass	United States	0	7,176	U-238, U-645
23 September 1943	Fort Jemseg	United Kingdom	1	7,134	U-238
23 September 1943	Oregon Express	Norway	8	3,642	U-238
23 September 1943	Skjelbred	Norway	0	5,096	U-238

=== Allied warships lost ===
Date	Name	Nationality	Casualties	Type	Sunk by...
20 September 1943	HMCS St Croix	Royal Canadian Navy	? 147	Town-class destroyer	U-305
20 September 1943	HMS Polyanthus	Royal Navy	? 88	Flower-class corvette	U-952
23 September 1943	HMS Itchen	Royal Navy	227	River-class frigate	U-666

=== Axis submarines lost ===
Date	Number	Type	Location	Casualties	Sunk by...
19 September 1943	U-341	VIIC	Atlantic, S of Iceland; 58°40′N 25°30′W	50	Air attack by Lib A, 10 Sqdn RCAF
20 September 1943	U-338	VIIC	Atlantic, SW of Iceland; 57°40′N 29°48′W	51	Possibly gunfire by HMCS Drumheller
21 September 1943	U-229	VIIC	Atlantic; 54°36′N 36°25′W	50	Gunfire, ramming by HMS Keppel

== See also ==
- List of shipwrecks in September 1943
