= German submarine U-666 =

German World War II submarine

History

Nazi Germany
- Name: U-666
- Ordered: 15 August 1940
- Builder: Deutsche Werft, Hamburg
- Yard number: 815
- Laid down: 16 September 1941
- Launched: 18 July 1942
- Commissioned: 26 August 1942
- Fate: Sunk on 10 February 1944

General characteristics
- Class & type: Type VIIC submarine
- Displacement: 769 tonnes (757 long tons) surfaced; 871 t (857 long tons) submerged
- Length: 67.10 m (220 ft 2 in) o/a; 50.50 m (165 ft 8 in) pressure hull
- Beam: 6.20 m (20 ft 4 in) o/a; 4.70 m (15 ft 5 in) pressure hull
- Draught: 4.74 m (15 ft 7 in)
- Installed power: 2,800–3,200 PS (2,100–2,400 kW; 2,800–3,200 bhp) (diesels); 750 PS (550 kW; 740 shp) (electric)
- Propulsion: 2 shafts; 2 × diesel engines; 2 × electric motors
- Speed: 17.7 knots (32.8 km/h; 20.4 mph) surfaced; 7.6 knots (14.1 km/h; 8.7 mph) submerged
- Range: 8,500 nmi (15,700 km; 9,800 mi) at 10 knots (19 km/h; 12 mph) surfaced; 80 nmi (150 km; 92 mi) at 4 knots (7.4 km/h; 4.6 mph) submerged
- Test depth: 230 m (750 ft); Crush depth: 250–295 m (820–968 ft)
- Complement: 4 officers, 40–56 enlisted
- Armament: 5 × 53.3 cm (21 in) torpedo tubes (4 bow, 1 stern); 14 × torpedoes; 1 × 8.8 cm (3.46 in) deck gun (220 rounds); 1 × twin 2 cm (0.79 in) C/30 anti-aircraft guns

Service record
- Part of: 5th U-boat Flotilla; 26 August 1942 – 28 February 1943; 6th U-boat Flotilla; 1 March 1943 – 10 February 1944
- Identification codes: M 51 377
- Commanders: Kptlt. Herbert Engel; 26 August 1942 – 9 December 1943; Oblt.z.S. Ernst Wilberg; 10 December 1943 – 10 February 1944
- Operations: 4 patrols: 1st patrol: 25 February – 10 April 1943; 2nd patrol: 6 May – 9 July 1943; 3rd patrol: a. 31 August – 16 October 1943; b. 16 – 18 December 1943; 4th patrol: 25 December 1943 – 10 February 1944
- Victories: 1 warship sunk (1,370 tons); 1 merchant ship damaged (5,234 GRT)

German submarine U-666 was a Type VIIC U-boat built for Nazi Germany's Kriegsmarine for service during World War II. She was laid down on 16 September 1941 by Deutsche Werft, Hamburg as yard number 815, launched on 18 July 1942 and commissioned on 26 August 1942 under Kapitänleutnant Herbert Engel. Oberleutnant zur See Ernst Wilberg took over command on 10 December 1943.

== Design ==
German Type VIIC submarines were preceded by the shorter Type VIIB submarines. U-666 had a displacement of 769 tonnes (757 long tons) when at the surface and 871 tonnes (857 long tons) while submerged. She had a total length of 67.10 m (220 ft 2 in), a pressure hull length of 50.50 m (165 ft 8 in), a beam of 6.20 m (20 ft 4 in), a height of 9.60 m (31 ft 6 in), and a draught of 4.74 m (15 ft 7 in). The submarine was powered by two Germaniawerft F46 four-stroke, six-cylinder supercharged diesel engines producing a total of 2,800 to 3,200 metric horsepower (2,060 to 2,350 kW; 2,760 to 3,160 shp) for use while surfaced, two Siemens-Schuckert GU 343/38–8 double-acting electric motors producing a total of 750 metric horsepower (550 kW; 740 shp) for use while submerged. She had two shafts and two 1.23 m (4 ft) propellers. The boat was capable of operating at depths of up to 230 metres (750 ft).

The submarine had a maximum surface speed of 17.7 knots (32.8 km/h; 20.4 mph) and a maximum submerged speed of 7.6 knots (14.1 km/h; 8.7 mph). When submerged, the boat could operate for 80 nautical miles (150 km; 92 mi) at 4 knots (7.4 km/h; 4.6 mph); when surfaced, she could travel 8,500 nautical miles (15,700 km; 9,800 mi) at 10 knots (19 km/h; 12 mph). U-666 was fitted with five 53.3 cm (21 in) torpedo tubes (four fitted at the bow and one at the stern), fourteen torpedoes, one 8.8 cm (3.46 in) SK C/35 naval gun, 220 rounds, and one twin 2 cm (0.79 in) C/30 anti-aircraft gun. The boat had a complement of between forty-four and sixty.

== Service history ==
The boat's career began with training at 5th U-boat Flotilla on 26 August 1942, followed by active service on 1 March 1943 as part of the 6th Flotilla for the remainder of her service.

In four patrols she damaged 1 merchant ship, for a total of 5,234 gross register tons (GRT) and sank one warship (1,370 tons).

=== Convoy SC 122 ===
On 19 March 1943, after damaging the Greek freighter Carras, a B-17 Flying Fortress bomber from No. 220 Squadron RAF hit the boat with four depth charges, causing sufficient damage as to force her to return to France.

=== Wolfpacks ===
U-666 took part in 14 wolfpacks, namely:

- Ostmark (6 – 11 March 1943)
- Stürmer (11 – 20 March 1943)
- Seewolf (21 – 30 March 1943)
- Oder (17 – 19 May 1943)
- Mosel (19 – 24 May 1943)
- Trutz (1 – 16 June 1943)
- Trutz 2 (16 – 29 June 1943)
- Leuthen (15 – 24 September 1943)
- Rossbach (24 September – 6 October 1943)
- Hela (28 December 1943 – 1 January 1944)
- Rügen 6 (5 – 7 January 1944)
- Rügen (7 – 26 January 1944)
- Stürmer (26 January – 3 February 1944)
- Igel 1 (3 – 10 February 1944)

=== Fate ===
U-666 was sunk on 10 February 1944 in the North Atlantic west of Ireland, in position 53.56N, 17.16W, by depth charges from a Swordfish aircraft (842 Sqn FAA/A) of the British escort carrier HMS Fencer. 51 dead (all hands lost).

== Summary of raiding history ==
Date	Ship Name	Nationality	Tonnage (Note: Merchant ship tonnages are in gross register tons. Military vessels are listed by tons displacement.)	Fate
19 March 1943	Carras	Greece	5,234	Damaged
23 September 1943	HMS Itchen	Royal Navy	1,370	Sunk

== See also ==
- Convoy SC 122

== Bibliography ==
- Busch, Rainer; Röll, Hans-Joachim (1999). German U-boat commanders of World War II : a biographical dictionary. Translated by Brooks, Geoffrey. London, Annapolis, Md: Greenhill Books, Naval Institute Press. ISBN 1-55750-186-6.
- Busch, Rainer; Röll, Hans-Joachim (1999). Der U-Boot-Krieg, 1939-1945: Deutsche U-Boot-Verluste von September 1939 bis Mai 1945 [German U-boat losses from September 1939 to May 1945] (in German). Vol. IV. Hamburg, Berlin, Bonn: Mittler. ISBN 3-8132-0514-2.
- Gröner, Eric; Jung, Dieter; Maass, Martin (1991). German Warships 1815-1945: U-boats and Mine Warfare Vessels. Vol. 2. Translated by Thomas, Keith; Magowan, Rachel. London: Conway Maritime Press. ISBN 0-85177-593-4.
- Sharpe, Peter (1998). U-Boat Fact File. Great Britain: Midland Publishing. ISBN 1-85780-072-9.
