= SS Empire Emerald =

World War II merchant ship of the United Kingdom

History
- Name: Empire Emerald (1941–46); El Gallo (1946–59)
- Owner: Ministry of War Transport (1941–46); Ministry of Transport (1946–59)
- Operator: C T Bowring & Co Ltd (1941–59)
- Port of registry: Middlesbrough, United Kingdom
- Builder: Furness Shipbuilding Co Ltd
- Yard number: 334
- Launched: 26 August 1941
- Completed: October 1941
- Maiden voyage: 15 October 1941
- Out of service: 5 February 1959
- Identification: United Kingdom Official Number 164849; Code Letters BCQC
- Fate: Scrapped

General characteristics
- Class & type: Tanker
- Tonnage: 8,032 GRT; 4,676 NRT
- Length: 463 ft 5 in (141.25 m)
- Beam: 61 ft 2 in (18.64 m)
- Draught: 27 ft 1 1/4 in (8.26 m)
- Depth: 33 ft 0 in (10.06 m)
- Propulsion: Triple expansion steam engine

Empire Emerald was a 8,032 GRT tanker that was built in 1941 by Furness Shipbuilding Co Ltd, Haverton Hill-on-Tees, Co Durham, United Kingdom for the Ministry of War Transport (MoWT). She was sold into merchant service in 1946 and renamed El Gallo, serving until 1959 when she was scrapped.

== Description ==
The ship was a 8,032 GRT tanker. She was built in 1941 by Furness Shipbuilding Co Ltd Haverton Hill-on-Tees, Co Durham. She was yard number 334,

The ship was 463 feet 5 inches (141.25 m) long, with a beam of 61 feet 2 inches (18.64 m). She had a depth of 33 feet 0 inches (10.06 m), and a draught of 27 feet 1 1/4 inches (8.261 m). She was assessed at 8,032 GRT, 4,676 NRT.

The ship was propelled by a 674 nhp triple expansion steam engine, which had cylinders of 27 inches (69 cm), 44 inches (110 cm) and 76 inches (190 cm) diameter by 51 inches (130 cm) stroke. The engine was built by Richardsons, Westgarth & Co Ltd, West Hartlepool, Co Durham.

== History ==
=== WWII ===
==== 1941 ====
Empire Emerald was launched on 26 August 1941 and completed in October. She was placed under the management of C T Bowring & Co Ltd. Her port of registry was Middlesbrough. The United Kingdom Official Number 164849 and Code Letters BCQC were allocated.

Empire Emerald arrived at the Tyne on 14 October 1941. She departed on her maiden voyage the next day, joining Convoy FN 532, which had departed from Southend, Essex on 14 October and arrived at Methil, Fife on 16 October. She then joined Convoy EC 86, which departed on 15 October and arrived at the Clyde on 20 October. She left the convoy at Loch Ewe on 19 October and sailed to New York, United States, arriving on 6 November and departing three days later for Halifax, Nova Scotia, Canada, where she arrived on 11 November. Empire Emerald then joined Convoy HX 160, which departed on 15 November and arrived at Liverpool, Lancashire, United Kingdom on 30 November. She was carrying a cargo of petrol. She left the convoy at the Belfast Lough on 29 November, departing on 2 December as a member of Convoy BB 107, which arrived at Milford Haven, Pembrokeshire the next day. She was involved in a collision on 3 December and arrived at Avonmouth, Somerset on 8 December.

==== 1942 ====
Empire Emerald departed from Avonmouth on 13 December, sailing to Barry, Glamorgan, from where she departed on 28 December for Milford Haven, arriving the next day. She departed on 30 December to join Convoy ON 52, which departed from Liverpool on 31 December and dispersed at sea on 11 January 1942. Her destination was Beaumont, Texas, United States, where she arrived on 27 January. She sailed four days later for Bermuda, arriving on 8 February and sailing the next day for Halifax, where she arrived on 12 February. Empire Emerald was a member of Convoy HX 175, which departed on 13 February and arrived at Liverpool on 25 February. She was carrying a cargo of avgas. She left the convoy at the Belfast Lough on 25 February, sailing two days later with Convoy BB 143, which arrived at Milford Haven on 28 February. Her destination was Avonmouth, where she arrived on 1 March.

Empire Emerald sailed for Milford Haven on 14 March, arriving the next day. Whilst she was in port, her captain, Edward Butcher had to go ashore to receive orders for the Convoy. During his return to the ship, an accident occurred which later resulted in the amputation of his leg below the knee. In 1953, he was unsuccessful in a war pension for the injury as it was deemed not to be directly attributable to the war. Empire Emerald joined Convoy ON 77, which departed from Liverpool on 17 March and dispersed at 43°41′N 59°12′W on 28 March. She left the convoy and proceeded to the Belfast Lough, arriving on 20 March and sailing four days later to join Convoy ON 79, which departed from Liverpool on 23 March and arrived at Halifax on 7 April. Her destination was New York, where she arrived on 7 April, departing five days later for Halifax, where she arrived on 20 April. Empire Emerald then joined Convoy HX 186, which departed that day and arrived at Liverpool on 2 May. She was carrying a cargo of paraffin and petrol. Her destination was the Clyde, where she arrived on 2 May.

Captain Charles Donn took command of the Empire Emerald on 4 May 1942 and remained as Master until 30 June 1945

Empire Emerald departed on 9 May to join Convoy ON 93, which had departed from Liverpool the previous day and dispersed at 38°55′N 42°43′W on 17 May. She then sailed to Charleston, South Carolina, United States, arriving on 25 May and sailing three days later for Port Arthur, Texas, where she arrived on 3 June. Empire Emerald departed on 5 June for Key West, Florida, arriving on 10 June. She was a member of Convoy KN 109, which departed on 11 June and arrived at the Hampton Roads, Virginia on 16 June. She sailed for New York on 18 June, arriving the next day and departing on 21 June for Cape Cod Bay, where she arrived on 22 June. Empire Emerald was a member of Convoy BX 26, which departed from Boston, Massachusetts on 24 June and arrived at Halifax two days later. She then joined Convoy HX 196, which departed on 29 June and arrived at Liverpool on 10 July. She left the convoy at the Belfast Lough, joining convoy BB 197, which departed on 11 July and arrived at Milford Haven the next day. She then sailed on to Barry.

Empire Emerald departed on 28 July for Milford Haven, arriving the next day and sailing on 30 July to join Convoy ON 117, which departed from Liverpool on 31 July and dispersed at sea on 15 August. She was bound for New York, where she arrived that day. On 17 August, she sailed to Philadelphia, Pennsylvania, arriving that day and returning to New York a week later. She departed for the Cape Cod Canal on 25 August, arriving the next day and joining Convoy BX 35B, which departed from Boston on 28 August and arrived at Halifax on 30 August. Empire Emerald was a member of Convoy HX 205, which departed on 31 August and arrived at Liverpool on 15 September. She was carrying a cargo of alcohol and petrol and was bound for Manchester, Lancashire.

Empire Emerald was a member of Convoy ON 133, which departed from Liverpool on 25 September and arrived at New York on 11 October. She departed on 13 October for Philadelphia, returning to New York on 21 October. Empire Emerald then joined Convoy HX 213, which departed on 26 October and arrived at Liverpool on 10 November. She was carrying a cargo of acetone, alcohol and petrol bound for Manchester.

==== 1943 ====
Empire Emerald departed from Liverpool on 14 December for Loch Ewe, arriving on 17 December. She joined Convoy JW 51B, which departed on 22 December and arrived at the Kola Inlet, Soviet Union on 4 January 1943. She was carrying 2,000 long tons (2,000 t) of Furnace Fuel Oil and 1,700 long tons (1,700 t) of avgas. The cargo was delivered to Molotovsk on 17 January. Empire Emerald was a member of Convoy RA 53, which departed from the Kola Inlet on 1 March and arrived at Loch Ewe on 14 March. She sailed on the Clyde, arriving on 16 March.

Empire Emerald sailed on 7 April to join Convoy ON 177, which had departed from Liverpool on 6 April and arrived at New York on 23 April. She returned with Convoy HX 237, which departed on 1 May and arrived at Liverpool on 17 May. She was carrying a cargo of petrol bound for the Stanlow Refinery, Ellesmere Port, Cheshire. Empire Emerald was a member of Convoy ON 186, which departed from Liverpool on 24 May and arrived at New York on 7 June. She was carrying the Convoy Commodore, Rear-Admiral E W Leir. Laden with a cargo of petrol bound for Avonmouth, she returned with Convoy HX 244, which departed on 15 June and arrived at Liverpool on 30 June. She left the convoy at the Belfast Lough on 29 June, joining Convoy BB 304, which arrived at Milford Haven on 1 July. She arrived at Avonmouth later that day.

Empire Emerald departed on 6 July for Milford Haven, arriving the next day. She sailed on 8 July to join Convoy ON 192, which departed from Liverpool on 9 July and arrived at New York on 22 July. She returned with Convoy HX 250, which departed on 30 July and arrived at Liverpool on 12 August. Her captain, Charles Donn was the convoy's Vice-Commodore. Empire Emerald was carrying a cargo of petrol bound for Avonmouth. She left the convoy at the Belfast Lough on 12 August to join Convoy BB 315, which arrived at Milford Haven the next day. She arrived at Avonmouth later that day.

Empire Emerald departed on 17 August for Milford Haven, arriving the next day. She sailed on 20 August to join Convoy ON 198, which departed from Liverpool on 21 August and arrived at New York on 4 September. She sailed on 12 September for the Hampton Roads, arriving the next day. Empire Emerald joined Convoy UGS 18, which departed on 15 September and arrived at Port Said, Egypt on 13 October. She left the convoy at Oran, Algeria, where she arrived on 4 October. She sailed five days later to join Convoy KMS 28, which had departed from Gibraltar on 7 October and arrived at Port Said on 19 October. She left the convoy at Bizerta, Algeria on 12 October. Empire Emerald sailed on 25 October to join Convoy KMS 29, which had departed from Gibraltar on 20 October and arrived at Port Said on 31 October. She left the convoy at Malta, where she arrived on 26 October. Empire Emerald was a member of Convoy VN 6, which departed on 26 October and arrived at Naples, Italy on 28 October. She departed on 3 November as a member of convoy NV 7, which arrived at Augusta, Sicily on 5 November. She sailed that day to join Convoy UGS 21, which had departed from the Hampton Roads on 15 October and arrived at Port Said on 11 November. Empire Emerald then sailed to Suez, from where she departed on 28 November for Aden, arriving on 4 December. She joined Convoy AP 55, which departed on 6 December and arrived at Bandar-Abbas, Iran on 14 December. She then sailed for Abadan, arriving the next day and departing on 17 December for Aden, where she arrived on 25 December. She sailed that day for Suez, arriving on 30 December.

==== 1944 ====
Empire Emerald then sailed to Port Said, from where she departed on 3 January 1944 for Alexandria, Egypt, arriving the next day. She then joined Convoy GUS 27, which departed from Port Said on 5 January and arrived at the Hampton Roads on 4 February. She left the convoy at Augusta, where she arrived on 11 January. She then joined Convoy AH 18, which departed on 12 January and arrived at Bari, Italy on 14 January. She returned to Augusta with Convoy HA 19, departing on 19 January and arriving on 21 January. Empire Emerald departed that day on a special voyage to Bizerta, arriving on 23 January. She departed on 1 February to join Convoy GUS 29, which had departed from Port Said on 25 January and arrived at the Hampton Roads on 22 February. She sailed on to New York, arriving that day. She was a member of Convoy HX 281, which departed on 27 February and arrived at Liverpool on 15 March. She was carrying a cargo of petrol bound for the Grangemouth Refinery, Stirlingshire, which was reached by leaving the convoy at Loch Ewe on 14 March and joining Convoy WN 557 to Methil, where she arrived on 16 March.

Empire Emerald was a member of Convoy EN 361, which departed from Methil on 21 March and arrived at Loch Ewe the next day. She then joined Convoy ON 229, which departed from Liverpool on 23 March and arrived at New York on 7 April. She sailed on 1 May for the Hampton Roads, arriving the next day and joining Convoy UGS 41, which departed on 3 May and arrived at Port Said on 30 May. She left the convoy at Augusta on 26 May. Empire Emerald was a member of Convoy VN 42, which departed on 27 May and arrived at Naples the next day. She returned to Augusta with Convoy NV 42, which departed on 1 June and arrived the next day. She sailed on 3 June to join Convoy MKS 51, which had departed from Port Said on 30 May and arrived at Gibraltar on 9 June. She left the convoy at Algiers, arriving on 7 June. Empire Emerald sailed on 12 June to join Convoy GUS 42, which had departed from Port Said on 3 June and arrived at the Hampton Roads on 29 June. She sailed on to New York, arriving later that day. She sailed on 2 July for Norfolk, Virginia, arriving the next day and sailing on 4 July for the Hampton Roads. Empire Emerald was a member of Convoy UGS 48, which departed on 14 July and arrived at Port Said on 8 August. She was bound for Augusta, arriving on 4 August. She then joined Convoy VN 57, which departed on 5 August and arrived at Naples the next day. She returned to Augusta with Convoy NV 58, which departed on 15 August and arrived at Augusta the next day. Empire Emerald sailed on 17 August to join Convoy GUS 49, which had departed from Port Said on 13 August and arrived at the Hampton Roads on 8 September. She left the convoy at Bizerta, arriving on 19 August and sailing eight days later to join Convoy KMS 60, which had departed from Gibraltar on 23 August and arrived at Port Said on 2 September. She left the convoy at Augusta, arriving on 29 August and departing that day as a member of Convoy AH 64, which arrived at Bari on 31 August. She left the convoy at Brindisi on 31 August. Empire Emerald later sailed to Bari, from where she departed under escort on 6 September for Ancona, Italy, arriving on 7 September. She departed under escort on 13 September for Brindisi, arriving the next day. She joined Convoy HA 67, which departed on 15 September and arrived at Augusta two days later. She sailed that day to join Convoy GUS 52, which had sailed from Port Said on 11 September and arrived at the Hampton Roads on 8 October. She left the convoy at Algiers, on 20 September, sailing five days later to join Convoy KMS 63. That convoy had departed from Gibraltar on 23 September and arrived at Port Said on 3 October. She left the convoy at Augusta, on 29 September. Empire Emerald was a member of Convoy AH 70, which departed that day and arrived at Bari on 1 October. She departed under escort on 7 October, arriving at Ancona the next day and sailing under escort for Bari on 12 October, arriving the next day. She departed under escort on 18 October, arriving at Ancona the next day. On 25 October, she departed under escort for Brindisi, arriving the next day. Empire Emerald was a member of Convoy HA 76, which departed on 31 October and arrived at Augusta on 2 November. She sailed to Bizerta, arriving on 4 November and departing four days later for Augusta, where she arrived on 10 November. She was a member of Convoy AH 79, which departed on 14 November and arrived at Bari on 16 November. She sailed on to Ancona, arriving the next day before returning to Bari, from where she departed under escort on 19 November for Ancona. Empire Emerald arrived at Ancona on 20 November, departing under escort on 25 November for Algiers, where she arrived on 30 November. She departed on 18 December for Augusta, arriving three days later and departing that day for Naples, where she arrived on 22 December. She joined Convoy VN 87, which departed that day and arrived at Livorno on 24 December. She left Livorno under escort on 29 December, arriving at Naples the next day.

==== 1945 ====
Empire Emerald departed on 14 January 1945 for Oran, arriving three days later and sailing that day as a member of Convoy GUS 66, which arrived at the Hampton Roads on 6 February. She sailed on to New York, arriving later that day. Laden with a cargo of petrol, she joined Convoy HX 343, which departed on 9 March and arrived at Liverpool on 24 March.

Empire Emerald sailed to Southend via The Downs, arriving on 26 March and departing that day as a member of Convoy TAM 119, which arrived at Antwerp, Belgium the next day. She returned with Convoy ATM 109, which departed on 30 March and arrived at Southend the next day. Empire Emerald then joined Convoy TBC 114, which departed on 30 March and arrived at Milford Haven on 3 April. She left the convoy at Falmouth, Cornwall on 2 April, sailing two days later to join Convoy ON 294, which had departed from Southend on 1 April and arrived at New York on 20 April. She loaded a cargo of avgas and returned with Convoy HX 352, which departed on 23 April and arrived at Liverpool on 8 May. She left the convoy at the Clyde.

=== Post-war ===
Empire Emerald was a member of Convoy JW67, which departed on 12 May and arrived at the Kola Inlet on 20 May. Her destination was Molotovsk, where she arrived on 22 May. She later sailed to Arkhangelsk, from where she departed on 2 June for the Clyde, arriving on 10 June. She departed on 20 June for Montreal, Quebec, Canada, from where she sailed on 5 July for Falmouth, arriving on 17 July and sailing that day for Liverpool, where she arrived two days later. She departed on 26 July for Ostend, Belgium, arriving on 30 July and sailing the next day for Rotterdam, Netherlands, where she arrived the next day. Empire Emerald sailed that day for Falmouth, arriving on 2 September and sailing two days later for Baltimore, Maryland, United States, where she arrived on 18 September. She sailed three days later for Naples, arriving on 7 October. She sailed on 15 October for Aruba, Netherlands Antilles, from where she departed on 6 November for Sheerness, Kent, United Kingdom. She arrived on 24 November and sailed two days later for Shell Haven, Essex, arriving on 27 November.

In 1946, Empire Emerald was sold to Lobitos Oilfields Ltd and renamed El Gallo. She remained under the management of Bowring's. On 20 April 1947, El Gallo suffered an engine breakdown off the coast of County Wicklow, Ireland. Two tugs were sent from Dublin to prevent her running aground on the Codling Bank. She was carrying 12,000 long tons (12,000 t) of kerosene from Curaçao, Netherlands Antilles to Dublin. In 1949, she made a voyage to Panama City, Panama and Santiago, Chile. In 1954, El Gallo underwent a survey, which resulted in repairs costing £85,000 being carried out as a result of metal fatigue being discovered in some structural areas of the ship. In 1958, Lobitos Oilfields Ltd reported that they intended to sell El Gallo. She arrived at Briton Ferry, Glamorgan on 5 February 1959 for scrapping.
