= Roderick S. McCook =

American naval officer

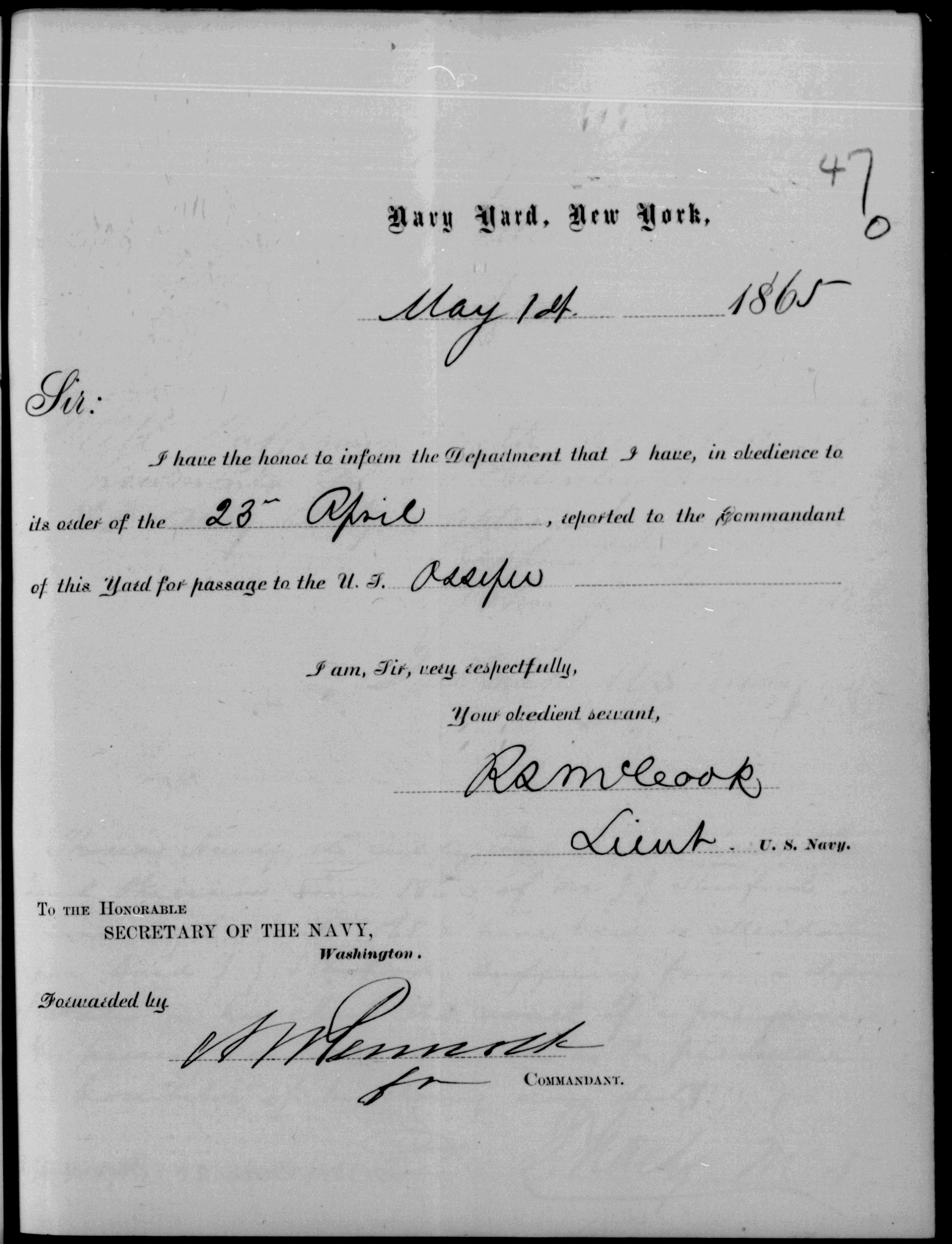
1865 document

Commander Roderick Sheldon McCook (10 March 1839 – 13 February 1886) was an officer in the United States Navy. He was a member of the famed family of American Civil War soldiers and sailors, the "Fighting McCooks."

== Biography ==
Born at New Lisbon, Ohio, McCook was appointed midshipman 21 September 1854. From 1859 to 1861, he cruised off the coast of Africa, searching for and capturing slavers. During the Civil War, he served in Minnesota (1861), Stars and Stripes (1862), and Canonicus (1863–65). As executive officer of latter ship, he participated in operations along the James River and in attacks on and the surrender of Fort Fisher. He was also present at the surrender of Charleston, South Carolina (February 1865).

From 1866 to 1878 he was in command of vessels of war on the West India and Asiatic stations. His last duty, 1880‑82, was as lighthouse inspector on the Ohio River. Promoted to commander 25 September 1873, McCook died at Vineland, New Jersey, February 13, 1886.

== Namesakes ==
Two ships have been named USS McCook for him.
