= List of German Type II submarines =

The list of German Type II submarines includes all Type II submarines (Unterseeboot or U-boat) built by Germany.

== Type IIA ==
=== U 1 ===
- Builder: Deutsche Werke AG at Kiel
- Laid down: 11 February 1935
- Commissioned: 29 June 1935
- Operations: 2 patrols
- Victories: None
- Fate: Sunk 6 April 1940 by a mine in the North Sea

=== U 2 ===
- Builder: Deutsche Werke AG at Kiel
- Laid down: 11 February 1935
- Commissioned: 25 July 1935
- Operations: 2 patrols, served with Unterseebootschulflottille and 21. Unterseebootflottille
- Victories: None
- Fate: Sunk 8 April 1944 from collision with Helmi Söhle near Pillau in the Baltic Sea

=== U 3 ===
- Builder: Deutsche Werke AG at Kiel
- Laid down: 11 February 1935
- Commissioned: 6 September 1935
- Operations: 5 patrols, served with Unterseebootschulflottille and 21. Unterseebootflottille
- Victories: 2 merchant ships (total of 2,348 gross register tons (GRT))
- Fate: Stricken 1 August 1944 and scrapped

=== U 4 ===
- Builder: Deutsche Werke AG at Kiel
- Laid down: 11 February 1935
- Commissioned: 17 August 1935
- Operations: 4 patrols, served with Unterseebootschulflottille and 21. Unterseebootflottille
- Victories: 3 merchant ships (total of 5,133 GRT) and 1 warship (1,090 tons)
- Fate: Stricken 1 August 1944 and scrapped

=== U 5 ===
- Builder: Deutsche Werke AG at Kiel
- Laid down: 11 February 1935
- Commissioned: 31 August 1935
- Operations: 2 patrols, served with Unterseebootschulflottille and 21. Unterseebootflottille
- Victories: None
- Fate: Sunk 19 March 1943 in diving accident near Pillau in the Baltic Sea

=== U 6 ===
- Builder: Deutsche Werke AG at Kiel
- Laid down: 11 February 1935
- Commissioned: 7 September 1935
- Operations: 2 patrols, served with Unterseebootschulflottille and 21. Unterseebootflottille
- Victories: None
- Fate: Stricken 7 August 1944

== Type IIB ==
=== U 7 ===
- Builder: Germaniawerft at Kiel
- Laid down: 11 March 1935
- Commissioned: 18 July 1935
- Operations: 6 patrols, served with Unterseebootschulflottille and 21. Unterseebootflottille
- Victories: 2 ships totalling 4,524 GRT
- Fate: Sunk 18 February 1944 in diving accident near Pillau in the Baltic Sea

=== U 8 ===
- Builder: Germaniawerft at Kiel
- Laid down: 25 March 1935
- Commissioned: 5 August 1935
- Operations: 1 patrol, served with Unterseebootschulflottille, U-Abwehrschule and 1. Unterseebootflottille, 22. Unterseebootflottille, and 24. Unterseebootflottille
- Victories: None
- Fate: Scuttled 5 May 1945 at Wilhelmshaven

=== U 9 ===
- Builder: Germaniawerft at Kiel
- Laid down: 8 April 1935
- Commissioned: 21 August 1935
- Operations: 19 patrols, served with 1. Unterseebootflottille, 21. Unterseebootflottille, 24. Unterseebootflottille, and 30. Unterseebootflottille
- Victories: 7 merchant ships totaling 16,669 GRT and 1 warship (552 tons) plus 1 ship damaged totaling 412 tons
- Fate: Sunk 20 August 1944 by Soviet aircraft at Constanţa in the Black Sea, raised by the Soviets as TS-16

=== U 10 ===
- Builder: Germaniawerft at Kiel
- Laid down: 22 April 1935
- Commissioned: 9 September 1935
- Operations: 5 patrols, served with Unterseebootschulflottille, 1. Unterseebootflottille, 3. Unterseebootflottille, and 21. Unterseebootflottille
- Victories: 2 ships totaling 6,356 GRT
- Fate: Stricken 1 August 1944

=== U 11 ===
- Builder: Germaniawerft at Kiel
- Laid down: 6 May 1935
- Commissioned: 21 September 1935
- Operations: Served with Unterseebootschulflottille, 1. Unterseebootflottille, 5. Unterseebootflottille, 21. Unterseebootflottille, and 22. Unterseebootflottillei>
- Victories: None
- Fate: Stricken 5 January 1945

=== U 12 ===
- Builder: Germaniawerft at Kiel
- Laid down: 20 May 1935
- Commissioned: 30 September 1935
- Operations: 2 patrols, served with 3. Unterseebootflottille
- Victories: None
- Fate: Sunk 8 October 1939 after a mine hit near Dover in the English Channel

The wrecksite of U-12 is designated as a protected place under the Protection of Military Remains Act. U-12 was the vessel nominated by the German authorities to represent all U-boats sunk in British waters in the second world war.

=== U 13 ===
- Builder: Deutsche Werke AG at Kiel
- Laid down: 20 June 1935
- Commissioned: 30 November 1935
- Operations: 9 patrols, served with 1. Unterseebootflottille
- Victories: 9 ships totaling 28,056 GRT plus 3 ships damaged totaling 26,218 GRT
- Fate: Sunk 31 May 1940 by the Royal Navy sloop HMS Weston

=== U 14 ===
- Builder: Deutsche Werke AG at Kiel
- Laid down: 6 July 1935
- Commissioned: 18 January 1936
- Operations: 6 patrols, served with 3. Unterseebootflottille, 22. Unterseebootflottille, 24. Unterseebootflottille, UnterseeAusbildungsflottille, and 1. UnterseeAusbildungsflottille
- Victories: 9 ships totaling 12,344 GRT
- Fate: Scuttled 5 May 1945 at Wilhelmshaven

=== U 15 ===
- Builder: Deutsche Werke AG at Kiel
- Laid down: 24 September 1935
- Commissioned: 7 March 1936
- Operations: 5 patrols, served with 1. Unterseebootflottille
- Victories: 3 ships (4,532 GRT)
- Fate: Sunk 30 January 1940 in collision with torpedo boat Iltis in the Hoofden

=== U 16 ===
- Builder: Deutsche Werke AG at Kiel
- Laid down: 5 August 1935
- Commissioned: 16 May 1936
- Operations: 3 patrols, served with 3. Unterseebootflottille
- Victories: 2 ships (3,435 GRT)
- Fate: Sunk 25 October 1939 by the Royal Navy trawler HMS Cayton Wyke and patrol vessel HMS Puffin

=== U 17 ===
- Builder: Germaniawerft at Kiel
- Laid down: 1 July 1935
- Commissioned: 3 December 1935
- Operations: 4 patrols, served with 1. Unterseebootflottille, 22. Unterseebootflottille, UnterseeAusbildungsflottille, and 1. UnterseeAusbildungsflottille
- Victories: 3 ships (1,825 GRT)
- Fate: Scuttled 5 May 1945 at Wilhelmshaven

=== U 18 ===
- Builder: Germaniawerft at Kiel
- Laid down: 10 July 1935
- Commissioned: 4 January 1936
- Operations: 14 patrols, served with 1. Unterseebootflottille, 3. Unterseebootflottille, 24. Unterseebootflottille, 30. Unterseebootflottille, UnterseeAusbildungsflottille, and 1. UnterseeAusbildungsflottille
- Victories: 3 ships (1,985 GRT) plus 2 damaged (7,745 GRT and 56 tons)
- Fate: Scuttled 25 August 1944 at Constanţa in the Black Sea

=== U 19 ===
- Builder: Germaniawerft at Kiel
- Laid down: 20 July 1935
- Commissioned: 16 January 1936
- Operations: 20 patrols, served with 1. Unterseebootflottille, 22. Unterseebootflottille, 24. Unterseebootflottille, 30. Unterseebootflottille, and 1. UnterseeAusbildungsflottille
- Victories: 15 ships (35,430 GRT and 441 tons)
- Fate: Scuttled 11 September 1944 near Turkey in the Black Sea

=== U 20 ===
- Builder: Germaniawerft at Kiel
- Laid down: 1 August 1935
- Commissioned: 1 February 1936
- Operations: 16 patrols, served with 1. Unterseebootflottille, 3. Unterseebootflottille, 21. Unterseebootflottille, 30. Unterseebootflottille, and 1. UnterseeAusbildungsflottille
- Victories: 13 ships (30,058 GRT) and 9 tons plus 3 damaged (10,292 GRT)
- Fate: Scuttled 10 September 1944 near Turkey in the Black Sea

=== U 21 ===
- Builder: Germaniawerft at Kiel
- Laid down: 4 March 1936
- Commissioned: 3 August 1936
- Operations: 7 patrols, served with 1. Unterseebootflottille and 21. Unterseebootflottille
- Victories: 6 ships (11,311 GRT) plus 1 damaged (11,500 tons)
- Fate: Interned by Norway 27 March to 9 April 1940, stricken 5 August 1944 and scrapped

=== U 22 ===
- Builder: Germaniawerft at Kiel
- Laid down: 4 March 1936
- Commissioned: 20 August 1936
- Operations: 7 patrols, served with 1. Unterseebootflottille and 3. Unterseebootflottille
- Victories: 9 ships (10,977 GRT) and 1,475 tons
- Fate: Went missing 27 March 1940 in the Skagerrak; probably struck a mine

=== U 23 ===
- Builder: Germaniawerft at Kiel
- Laid down: 11 April 1936
- Commissioned: 24 September 1936
- Operations: 16 patrols, served with 1. Unterseebootflottille, 21. Unterseebootflottille, and 30. Unterseebootflottille
- Victories: 12 ships (29,378 GRT) and 1,410 tons
- Fate: Scuttled 10 September 1944 near Turkey in the Black Sea

=== U 24 ===
- Builder: Germaniawerft at Kiel
- Laid down: 21 April 1936
- Commissioned: 10 October 1936
- Operations: 19 patrols, served with 1. Unterseebootflottille, 3. Unterseebootflottille, 21. Unterseebootflottille, 30. Unterseebootflottille, and 1. UnterseeAusbildungsflottille
- Victories: 7 ships (8,847 GRT) and 573 tons plus 1 damaged (7,661 GRT)
- Fate: Scuttled 25 August 1944 at Constanţa on the Black Sea

=== U 120 ===
- Builder: Flender Werke AG at Lübeck
- Laid down: 31 March 1938
- Commissioned: 20 April 1940
- Operations: Served with 21. Unterseebootflottille, 31. Unterseebootflottille, and Unterseebootschulflottille
- Victories: None
- Fate: Scuttled 5 May 1945 at Bremerhaven, raised 1950 and scrapped

=== U 121 ===
- Builder: Flender Werke AG at Lübeck
- Laid down: 16 April 1938
- Commissioned: 28 May 1940
- Operations: Served with 21. Unterseebootflottille, 24. Unterseebootflottille, 31. Unterseebootflottille, and Unterseebootschulflottille
- Victories: None
- Fate: Scuttled 5 May 1945 at Bremerhaven, raised 1950 and scrapped

== Type IIC ==
=== U 56 ===
- Builder: Deutsche Werke AG at Kiel
- Laid down: 21 September 1937
- Commissioned: 26 November 1938
- Operations: 12 patrols, served with 1. Unterseebootflottille, 5. Unterseebootflottille, 19. Unterseebootflottille, 22. Unterseebootflottille, and 24. Unterseebootflottille
- Victories: 4 ships (25,783 GRT)
- Fate: Scuttled on 3 May 1945

=== U 57 ===
- Builder: Deutsche Werke AG at Kiel
- Laid down: 14 September 1937
- Commissioned: 29 December 1938
- Operations: 11 patrols, served with 1. Unterseebootflottille, 5. Unterseebootflottille, 19. Unterseebootflottille, and 22. Unterseebootflottille
- Victories: 13 ships (66,484 GRT) plus 2 damaged (10,403 GRT)
- Fate: Scuttled 3 May 1945 at Kiel

=== U 58 ===
- Builder: Deutsche Werke AG at Kiel
- Laid down: 29 September 1937
- Commissioned: 4 February 1939
- Operations: 12 patrols, served with 1. Unterseebootflottille, 5. Unterseebootflottille, 19. Unterseebootflottille, and 22. Unterseebootflottille
- Victories: 7 ships (24,549 GRT)
- Fate: Scuttled 3 May 1945 at Kiel

=== U 59 ===
- Builder: Deutsche Werke AG at Kiel
- Laid down: 5 October 1937
- Commissioned: 4 March 1939
- Operations: 13 patrols, served with 1. Unterseebootflottille, 5. Unterseebootflottille, 19. Unterseebootflottille, and 22. Unterseebootflottille
- Victories: 20 ships (39,937 GRT)
- Fate: Stricken April 1945, scuttled and scrapped

=== U 60 ===
- Builder: Deutsche Werke AG at Kiel
- Laid down: 1 October 1938
- Commissioned: 22 July 1939
- Operations: 9 patrols, served with 1. Unterseebootflottille, 5. Unterseebootflottille, and 21. Unterseebootflottille
- Victories: 3 ships (7,561 GRT) plus 1 damaged (15,434 GRT)
- Fate: Scuttled 5 May 1945 at Wilhelmshaven

=== U 61 ===
- Builder: Deutsche Werke AG at Kiel
- Laid down: 1 October 1938
- Commissioned: 12 August 1939
- Operations: 10 patrols, served with 1. Unterseebootflottille, 5. Unterseebootflottille, and 21. Unterseebootflottille
- Victories: 5 ships (19,668 GRT) plus 1 damaged (4,434 GRT)
- Fate: Scuttled 5 May 1945 at Wilhelmshaven

=== U 62 ===
- Builder: Deutsche Werke AG at Kiel
- Laid down: 2 January 1939
- Commissioned: 21 December 1939
- Operations: 5 patrols, served with 1. Unterseebootflottille, 5. Unterseebootflottille, and 21. Unterseebootflottille
- Victories: 2 ships (4,581 GRT and 1,350 tons)
- Fate: Scuttled 5 May 1945 at Wilhelmshaven

=== U 63 ===
- Builder: Deutsche Werke AG at Kiel
- Laid down: 2 January 1939
- Commissioned: 18 January 1940
- Operations: 1 patrol, served with 1. Unterseebootflottille
- Victories: 1 ship (3,840 GRT)
- Fate: Sunk 25 February 1940 near the Shetland Islands in the North Sea by Royal Navy destroyers Escort, Inglefield, and Imogen, and the submarine Narwhal

== Type IID ==
=== U 137 ===
- Builder: Deutsche Werke AG at Kiel
- Laid down: 16 November 1939
- Commissioned: 15 June 1940
- Operations: 4 patrols, served with 1. Unterseebootflottille and 22. Unterseebootflottille
- Victories: 6 ships (24,136 GRT) plus 2 damaged (15,469 GRT)
- Fate: Scuttled 5 May 1945 at Wilhelmshaven

=== U 138 ===
- Builder: Deutsche Werke AG at Kiel
- Laid down: 16 November 1939
- Commissioned: 27 June 1940
- Operations: 5 patrols, served with 1. Unterseebootflottille, 3. Unterseebootflottille, and 22. Unterseebootflottille
- Victories: 6 ships (48,564 GRT) plus 1 damaged (6,993 GRT)
- Fate: Scuttled 18 June 1941 near Cadiz, Spain in the Atlantic Ocean after being damaged by the Royal Navy destroyers HMS Faulknor, HMS Fearless, HMS Forester, HMS Foresight and HMS Foxhound.

=== U 139 ===
- Builder: Deutsche Werke AG at Kiel
- Laid down: 20 November 1939
- Commissioned: 24 July 1940
- Operations: Served with 1. Unterseebootflottille, 21. Unterseebootflottille, and 22. Unterseebootflottille
- Victories: None
- Fate: Scuttled 5 May 1945 at Wilhelmshaven

=== U 140 ===
- Builder: Deutsche Werke AG at Kiel
- Laid down: 16 November 1939
- Commissioned: 7 August 1940
- Operations: 3 patrols, served with 1. Unterseebootflottille, 22. Unterseebootflottille, and 31. Unterseebootflottille
- Victories: 4 ships (12,410 GRT and 206 tons)
- Fate: Scuttled 5 May 1945 at Wilhelmshaven, later scrapped

=== U 141 ===
- Builder: Deutsche Werke AG at Kiel
- Laid down: 12 December 1939
- Commissioned: 21 August 1940
- Operations: 4 patrols, served with 1. Unterseebootflottille, 3. Unterseebootflottille, 21. Unterseebootflottille, and 31. Unterseebootflottille
- Victories: 4 ships (6,801 GRT) plus 1 damaged (5,133 GRT)
- Fate: Scuttled 5 May 1945 at Wilhelmshaven, later scrapped

=== U 142 ===
- Builder: Deutsche Werke AG at Kiel
- Laid down: 12 December 1939
- Commissioned: 4 September 1940
- Operations: 3 patrols, served with 1. Unterseebootflottille, 5. Unterseebootflottille, 22. Unterseebootflottille, and 24. Unterseebootflottille
- Victories: None
- Fate: Scuttled 5 May 1945 at Wilhelmshaven, later scrapped

=== U 143 ===
- Builder: Deutsche Werke AG at Kiel
- Laid down: 3 January 1940
- Commissioned: 18 September 1940
- Operations: 4 patrols, served with 1. Unterseebootflottille, 3. Unterseebootflottille, 22. Unterseebootflottille, and 24. Unterseebootflottille
- Victories: 1 ship (1,409 GRT)
- Fate: Surrendered to the Allies 30 June 1945 for Operation Deadlight, sunk 22 December 1945

=== U 144 ===
- Builder: Deutsche Werke AG at Kiel
- Laid down: 10 January 1940
- Commissioned: 2 October 1940
- Operations: 3 patrols, served with 1. Unterseebootflottille, and 22. Unterseebootflottille
- Victories: 1 ship (206 tons)
- Fate: Sunk 10 August 1941 near Hiiumaa (Dagö) in the Gulf of Finland by Soviet Navy submarine Щ-307

=== U 145 ===
- Builder: Deutsche Werke AG at Kiel
- Laid down: 29 March 1940
- Commissioned: 16 October 1940
- Operations: 3 patrols, served with 1. Unterseebootflottille, and 22. Unterseebootflottille
- Victories: None
- Fate: Surrendered to the Allies 5 May 1945 for Operation Deadlight, sunk 22 December 1945

=== U 146 ===
- Builder: Deutsche Werke AG at Kiel
- Laid down: 30 March 1940
- Commissioned: 30 October 1940
- Operations: 2 patrols, served with 1. Unterseebootflottille, 3. Unterseebootflottille, and 22. Unterseebootflottille
- Victories: 1 ship (3,496 GRT)
- Fate: Scuttled 5 May 1945 at Wilhelmshaven

=== U 147 ===
- Builder: Deutsche Werke AG at Kiel
- Laid down: 10 April 1940
- Commissioned: 11 December 1940
- Operations: 3 patrols, served with 1. Unterseebootflottille, 3. Unterseebootflottille, and 22. Unterseebootflottille
- Victories: 3 ships (11,141 GRT) plus 1 damaged (4,996 GRT)
- Fate: Sunk 2 June 1941 near Ireland in the Atlantic Ocean, by the Royal Navy destroyer HMS Wanderer and corvette Periwinkle

=== U 148 ===
- Builder: Deutsche Werke AG at Kiel
- Laid down: 10 April 1940
- Commissioned: 28 December 1940
- Operations: Served with 21. Unterseebootflottille, 24. Unterseebootflottille, and 31. Unterseebootflottille
- Victories: None
- Fate: Scuttled 5 May 1945 at Wilhelmshaven, later scrapped

=== U 149 ===
- Builder: Deutsche Werke AG at Kiel
- Laid down: 25 May 1940
- Commissioned: 13 November 1940
- Operations: 1 patrol, served with 1. Unterseebootflottille and 22. Unterseebootflottille
- Victories: 1 ship (206 tons)
- Fate: Surrendered to the Allies 5 May 1945 for Operation Deadlight, sunk 22 December 1945

=== U 150 ===
- Builder: Deutsche Werke AG at Kiel
- Laid down: 25 May 1940
- Commissioned: 27 November 1940
- Operations: Served with 1. Unterseebootflottille, 22. Unterseebootflottille, and 31. Unterseebootflottille
- Victories: None
- Fate: Surrendered to the Allies on 5 May 1945 at Wilhelmshaven

=== U 151 ===
- Builder: Deutsche Werke AG at Kiel
- Laid down: 6 July 1940
- Commissioned: 15 January 1941
- Operations: Served with 21. Unterseebootflottille, 24. Unterseebootflottille, and 31. Unterseebootflottille
- Victories: None
- Fate: Scuttled 5 May 1945 at Wilhelmshaven

=== U 152 ===
- Builder: Deutsche Werke AG at Kiel
- Laid down: 6 July 1940
- Commissioned: 29 January 1941
- Operations: Served with 21. Unterseebootflottille, 24. Unterseebootflottille, and 31. Unterseebootflottille
- Victories: None
- Fate: Scuttled 5 May 1945 at Wilhelmshaven, later scrapped

== See also ==
- List of Kriegsmarine ships
- List of naval ships of Germany
- List of World War II ships of less than 1000 tons
