= List of ship commissionings in 1940 =

The list of ship commissionings in 1940 is a chronological list of ships commissioned in 1940. In cases where no official commissioning ceremony was held, the date of service entry may be used instead.

Date	Operator	Ship	Class and type	Notes	Ref
18 January	Kriegsmarine	U-63	Type IIC submarine		
1 February	Spanish Navy	Kanguro	Submarine rescue ship	Previously in commission 1921–1939	
1 March	Kriegsmarine	Adolf Vinnen	weather ship	ex-fishing trawler Gustav Adolf Kühling	
6 March	United States Navy	Tippecanoe	Patoka-class oiler		
unknown date	United States Coast and Geodetic Survey	Explorer	survey ship	entered service in spring 1940	
1 April	French Navy	Richelieu	Richelieu-class battleship		
6 April	Royal Navy	Gladiolus	Flower-class corvette		
20 April	Kriegsmarine	U-120	Type IIB submarine		
23 April	Royal Norwegian Navy	Honningsvåg	Naval trawler	ex-Malangen, captured from Germany	
25 April	United States Navy	Wasp	aircraft carrier		
28 May	Kriegsmarine	U-121	Type IIB submarine		
13 June	Kriegsmarine	Tiger	torpedo boat	ex-Norwegian Sleipner-class destroyer Tor	
15 June	Kriegsmarine	U-137	Type IID submarine		
17 June	United States Navy	Abbot	Wickes-class destroyer	recommissioned from reserve	
27 June	Kriegsmarine	U-138	Type IID submarine		
8 July	Kriegsmarine	Hessen	weather ship	converted sealer	
24 July	Kriegsmarine	U-139	Type IID submarine		
1 August	Kriegsmarine	Prinz Eugen	Admiral Hipper-class cruiser		
7 August	Kriegsmarine	U-140	Type IID submarine		
20 August	Kriegsmarine	Bismarck	Bismarck-class battleship		
21 August	Kriegsmarine	U-141	Type IID submarine		
22 August	Kriegsmarine	Karl Meyer	Karl Meyer-class seaplane tender	completion date	
4 September	Kriegsmarine	U-142	Type IID submarine		
9 September	Royal Navy	Castleton	Town-class destroyer	ex-USS Aaron Ward, commissioned at Halifax upon transfer from the United States Navy under the command of Cmdr. Frank H. E. Skyrme	
9 September	Royal Navy	Clare	Town-class destroyer	ex-USS Abel P. Upshur, commissioned at Halifax upon transfer from the United States Navy	
18 September	Kriegsmarine	U-143	Type IID submarine		
23 September	Royal Navy	Charlestown	Town-class destroyer	ex-USS Abbot transferred as part of the destroyers-for-bases deal	
24 September	Royal Canadian Navy	St. Clair	Town-class destroyer		
2 October	Kriegsmarine	U-144	Type IID submarine		
16 October	Kriegsmarine	U-145	Type IID submarine		
23 October	Royal Navy	Lancaster	Town-class destroyer	Ex-USS Philip	
23 October	Royal Navy	Mansfield	Town-class destroyer	Ex-USS Evans	
23 October	Royal Navy	Montgomery	Town-class destroyer	Ex-USS Wickes	
30 October	United States Navy	Santee	Cimarron-class oiler (1939)	ex-merchant tanker Seakay	
30 October	Kriegsmarine	U-146	Type IID submarine		
4 November	United States Navy	Sangamon	Cimarron-class oiler	ex-Esso Trenton	
13 November	Kriegsmarine	U-149	Type IID submarine		
26 November	Royal Navy	Newark	Town-class destroyer	Ex-USS Ringgold	
27 November	Kriegsmarine	U-150	Type IID submarine		
5 December	Royal Navy	Newmarket	Town-class destroyer	Ex-USS Robinson	
5 December	Royal Navy	Newport	Town-class destroyer	Ex-USS Sigourney	
5 December	Royal Navy	Richmond	Town-class destroyer	Ex-USS Fairfax	
11 December	Kriegsmarine	U-147	Type IID submarine		
11 December	Royal Navy	King George V	King George V-class battleship		
unknown date	Kriegsmarine	Schwabenland	seaplane tender	converted merchant	
unknown date	Kriegsmarine	August Wriedt	weather ship	ex-FV August Wriedt	
