= German submarine U-150 =

U-150 may refer to one of the following German submarines:

- SM U-150, a Type U 142 submarine laid down during World War I but unfinished at the end of the war; broken up incomplete 1919–20
  - During the First World War, Germany also had this submarine with a similar name:
    - SM UB-150, a Type UB III submarine launched in 1918; hulk dumped in the Medway in 1922
- German submarine U-150 (1940), a Type IID submarine that served in World War II; taken to Loch Ryan on 30 June 1945
