= German submarine U-145 =

U-145 may refer to one of the following German submarines:

- SM U-145, a Type U 142 submarine laid down during the First World War but unfinished at the end of the war; broken up incomplete 1919–20
  - During the First World War, Germany also had this submarine with a similar name:
    - SM UB-145, a Type UB III submarine launched in 1918 and surrendered on 27 March 1919; hulk dumped in the Medway in 1922
- German submarine U-145 (1940), a Type IID submarine that served in the Second World War; taken to Loch Ryan on 30 June 1945; sunk on 21 December 1945 as a part of Operation Deadlight
