= German submarine U-151 =

U-151 may refer to one of the following German submarines:

- SM U-151, the lead ship of the Type U 151 submarines; launched in 1917 and that served in the First World War until surrendered to France; sunk as target ship on 7 June 1921
  - During the First World War, Germany also had this submarine with a similar name:
    - SM UB-151, a Type UB III submarine laid down but unfinished at the end of the war; broken up incomplete in 1919
- German submarine U-151 (1940), a Type IID submarine that served in the Second World War until scuttled on 2 May 1945; wreck broken up at later date
