= German submarine U-148 =

U-148 may refer to one of the following German submarines:

- SM U-148, a Type U 142 submarine launched during the First World War but unfinished at the end of the war; broken up incomplete 1919–20
  - During the First World War, Germany also had this submarine with a similar name:
    - SM UB-148, a Type UB III submarine launched in 1918; surrendered to the United States; sunk as a target
- German submarine U-148 (1940), a Type IID submarine that served in the Second World War until scuttled on 2 May 1945; wreck broken up at later date
