= HNLMS Hobein =

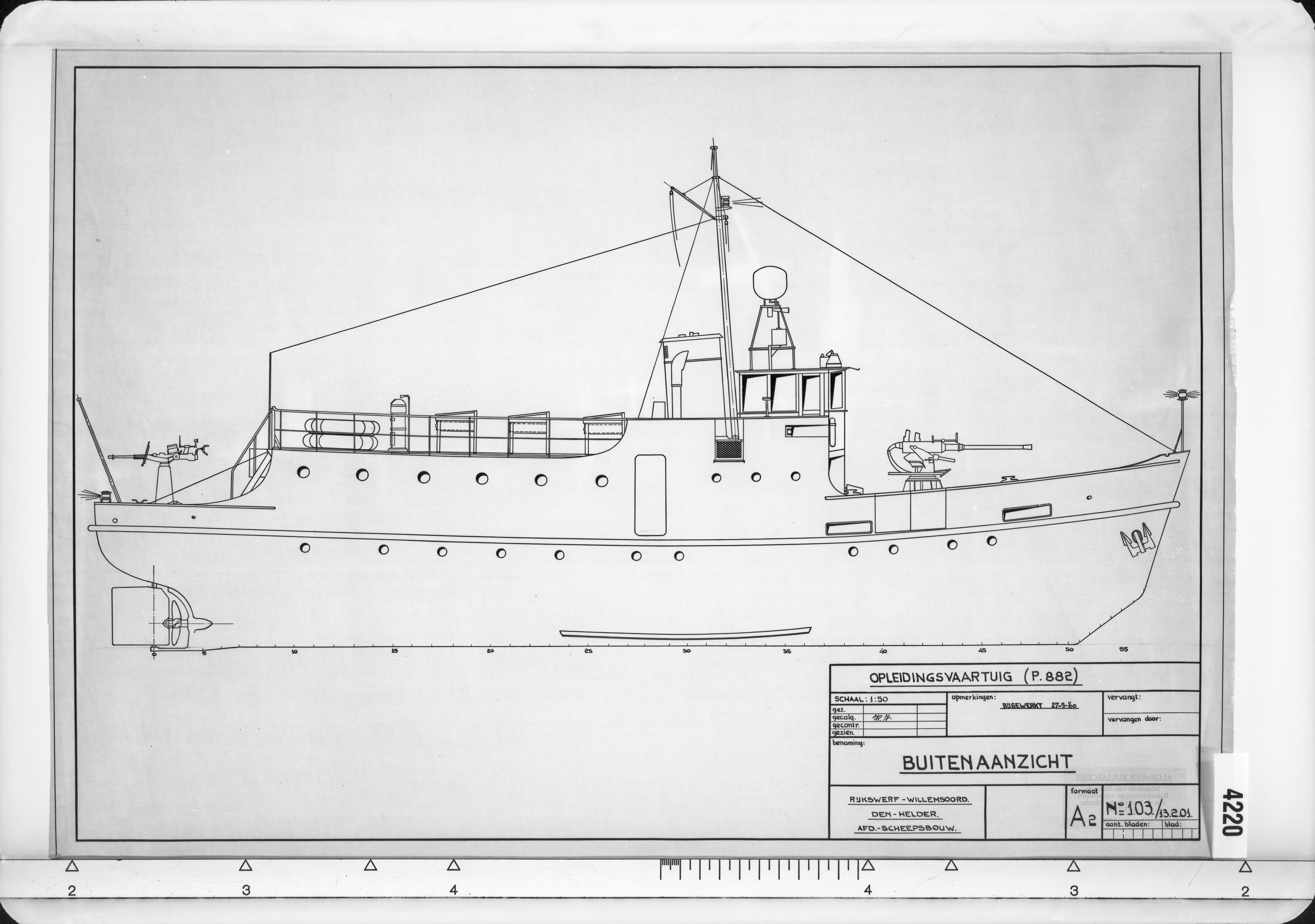

History

Germany
- Name: Dornbusch
- Builder: Deutsche Werke, Kiel, Germany
- Launched: 1937

Netherlands
- Name: Doornbosch (later spelled Doornbos)
- In service: July 1948
- Out of service: 26 February 1973
- Renamed: Hobein
- Identification: Y 8101
- Fate: Sold on 29 May 1973 to J. van der Veldt & Zoon, Amsterdam

General characteristics
- Type: Training ship
- Displacement: 132 t (130 long tons)
- Length: 28 m (91 ft 10 in)
- Beam: 5.5 m (18 ft 1 in)
- Draught: 1.71 m (5 ft 7 in)
- Propulsion: 1 shaft; 250 bhp (190 kW); DMW diesel engine
- Speed: 9 knots (17 km/h; 10 mph)
- Crew: 10
- Armament: 1 x 40 mm machine gun; 1 x 20 mm machine gun

HNLMS Hobein was a training ship of the Royal Netherlands Navy (RNLN). She was built in Germany originally for the Kriegsmarine as Dornbusch. After the Second World War Dornbusch was transferred to the Netherlands and entered service in the RNLN as Doornbosch (later spelled Doornbos). In 1952 her name was changed to Hobein. After many years of service, she was decommissioned on 26 February 1973. On 29 May 1973, she was sold to J. van der Veldt & Zoon in Amsterdam.

== Design and construction ==
Hobein was built in 1937 at Deutsche Werke in Kiel, Germany. She was originally named Dornbusch and served in the Kriegsmarine as navigational training ship for the Luftwaffe. After transferring to the Netherlands and entering service in the Royal Netherlands Navy (RNLN) in 1948, she was used as a training ship for midshipmen. Hobein had a displacement of 132 tonnes (130 long tons) and a complement of ten. When it came to measurements she had a length of 28 metres (91 ft 10 in), a beam of 5.5 metres (18 ft 1 in) and a draught of 1.71 metres (5 ft 7 in). Furthermore, Hobein was equipped with a DMW diesel engine that could produce 250 brake horsepower (190 kW), which allowed her to reach a maximum speed 9 knots (17 km/h; 10 mph). As armament she had a single 40-millimetre (1.6 in) gun and a single 20 mm (0.79 in) gun.

== Citations ==
=== Bibliography ===
- Blackman, Raymond V.B., ed. (1953). Jane's Fighting Ships 1953-54. London: Sampson Low, Marston & Co.
- Ministerie van Marine, ed. (1959). "Overzicht der oorlogsschepen". Jaarboek van de Koninklijke Marine, 1958 (in Dutch). The Hague: Staatsdrukkerij en uitgeverijbedrijf. pp. 246–267.
- Raven, G.J.A., ed. (1988). De kroon op het anker: 175 jaar Koninklijke Marine (in Dutch). Amsterdam: De Bataafsche Leeuw. ISBN 90-6707-200-1.
- van Amstel, W.H.E. (1991). De schepen van de Koninklijke Marine vanaf 1945 (in Dutch). Alkmaar: De Alk. ISBN 90-6013-997-6.
