= German submarine U-15 (1936) =

German World War II submarine

Coordinates: 54°24′N 7°50′E

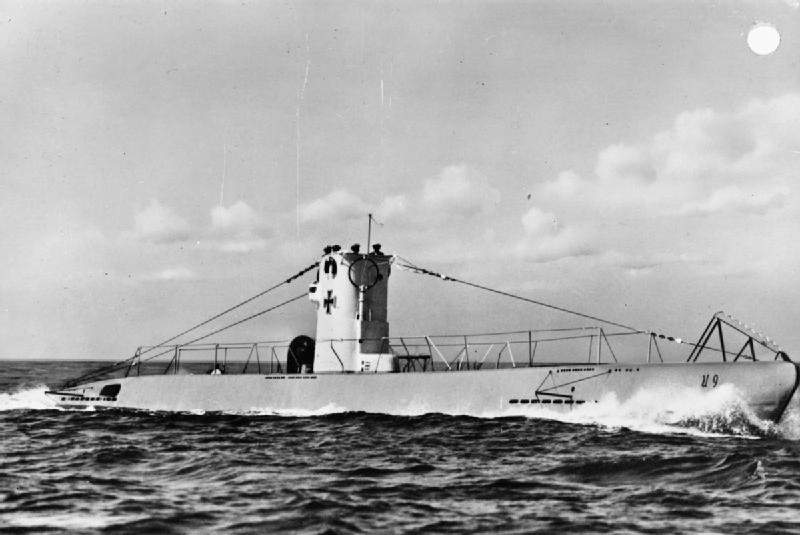
- U-9, a typical Type IIB boat

History

Nazi Germany
- Name: U-15
- Ordered: 2 February 1935
- Builder: Deutsche Werke, Kiel
- Yard number: 250
- Laid down: 24 September 1935
- Launched: 15 February 1936
- Commissioned: 7 March 1936
- Fate: Sunk 30 January 1940

General characteristics
- Class & type: Type IIB coastal submarine
- Displacement: 279 t (275 long tons) surfaced; 328 t (323 long tons) submerged
- Length: 42.70 m (140 ft 1 in) o/a; 27.80 m (91 ft 2 in) pressure hull
- Beam: 4.08 m (13 ft 5 in) (o/a); 4.00 m (13 ft 1 in) (pressure hull)
- Height: 8.60 m (28 ft 3 in)
- Draught: 3.90 m (12 ft 10 in)
- Installed power: 700 PS (510 kW; 690 bhp) (diesels); 410 PS (300 kW; 400 shp) (electric)
- Propulsion: 2 shafts; 2 × diesel engines; 2 × electric motors
- Speed: 13 knots (24 km/h; 15 mph) surfaced; 7 knots (13 km/h; 8.1 mph) submerged
- Range: 1,800 nmi (3,300 km; 2,100 mi) at 12 knots (22 km/h; 14 mph) surfaced; 35–43 nmi (65–80 km; 40–49 mi) at 4 knots (7.4 km/h; 4.6 mph) submerged
- Test depth: 80 m (260 ft)
- Complement: 3 officers, 22 men
- Armament: 3 × 53.3 cm (21 in) torpedo tubes; 5 × torpedoes or up to 12 TMA or 18 TMB mines; 1 × 2 cm (0.79 in) anti-aircraft gun

Service record
- Part of: 1st U-boat Flotilla; 1 March 1936 – 1 August 1939; 1 September 1939 – 30 January 1940
- Identification codes: M 06 991
- Commanders: Oblt.z.S. / Kptlt. Werner von Schmidt; 30 September 1935 – 1 October 1937; Kptlt. Hans Cohausz; 16 May – 2 August 1936; Oblt.z.S. / Kptlt. Heinz Buchholz; 1 October 1937 – 26 October 1939; Oblt.z.S. / Kptlt. Peter Frahm; 27 October 1939 – 30 January 1940
- Operations: 5 patrols: 1st patrol: a. 25 – 30 August 1939; b. 31 August – 8 September 1939; 2nd patrol: a. 20 September – 8 October 1939; b. 9 October 1939; c. 6 – 7 November 1939; 3rd patrol: a. 14 – 18 November 1939; b. 19 November 1939; 4th patrol: 9 – 20 January 1940; 5th patrol: 29 – 30 January 1940
- Victories: 3 merchant ships sunk (4,532 GRT)

German submarine U-15 was a Type IIB U-boat of the Kriegsmarine. It was commissioned on 7 March 1936, following construction at the Deutsche Werke shipyards at Kiel. Its first commander was Werner von Schmidt. In its career, it completed five patrols, all while serving under the 1st U-boat Flotilla. It sank three ships.

== Design ==
German Type IIB submarines were enlarged versions of the original Type IIs. U-15 had a displacement of 279 tonnes (275 long tons) when at the surface and 328 tonnes (323 long tons) while submerged. Officially, the standard tonnage was 250 long tons (250 t), however. The U-boat had a total length of 42.70 m (140 ft 1 in), a pressure hull length of 28.20 m (92 ft 6 in), a beam of 4.08 m (13 ft 5 in), a height of 8.60 m (28 ft 3 in), and a draught of 3.90 m (12 ft 10 in). The submarine was powered by two MWM RS 127 S four-stroke, six-cylinder diesel engines of 700 metric horsepower (510 kW; 690 shp) for cruising, two Siemens-Schuckert PG VV 322/36 double-acting electric motors producing a total of 460 metric horsepower (340 kW; 450 shp) for use while submerged. She had two shafts and two 0.85 m (3 ft) propellers. The boat was capable of operating at depths of up to 80–150 metres (260–490 ft).

The submarine had a maximum surface speed of 12 knots (22 km/h; 14 mph) and a maximum submerged speed of 7 knots (13 km/h; 8.1 mph). When submerged, the boat could operate for 35–42 nautical miles (65–78 km; 40–48 mi) at 4 knots (7.4 km/h; 4.6 mph); when surfaced, she could travel 3,800 nautical miles (7,000 km; 4,400 mi) at 8 knots (15 km/h; 9.2 mph). U-15 was fitted with three 53.3 cm (21 in) torpedo tubes at the bow, five torpedoes or up to twelve Type A torpedo mines, and a 2 cm (0.79 in) anti-aircraft gun. The boat had a complement of twentyfive.

== Fate ==
On 30 January 1940, U-15 was sunk in the North Sea in the Hoofden, after being rammed by accident by the German torpedo boat Iltis. 25 men died; there were no survivors.

== Summary of raiding history ==
Date	Name	Nationality	Tonnage (GRT)	Fate
10 September 1939	Goodwood	United Kingdom	2,796	Sunk
21 October 1939	Orsa	United Kingdom	1,478	Sunk
28 December 1939	Resercho	United Kingdom	258	Sunk

== Bibliography ==
- Busch, Rainer; Röll, Hans-Joachim (1999). German U-boat commanders of World War II : a biographical dictionary. Translated by Brooks, Geoffrey. London, Annapolis, Md: Greenhill Books, Naval Institute Press. ISBN 1-55750-186-6.
- Busch, Rainer; Röll, Hans-Joachim (1999). Deutsche U-Boot-Verluste von September 1939 bis Mai 1945 [German U-boat losses from September 1939 to May 1945]. Der U-Boot-Krieg (in German). Vol. IV. Hamburg, Berlin, Bonn: Mittler. ISBN 3-8132-0514-2.
- Gröner, Erich; Jung, Dieter; Maass, Martin (1991). U-boats and Mine Warfare Vessels. German Warships 1815–1945. Vol. 2. Translated by Thomas, Keith; Magowan, Rachel. London: Conway Maritime Press. ISBN 0-85177-593-4.
- Kemp, Paul (1997). U-Boats Destroyed, German submarine Losses in the World Wars. Arms and Armour. ISBN 1-85409-515-3.
