= German submarine U-144 (1940) =

German World War II submarine

History

Nazi Germany
- Name: U-144
- Ordered: 25 September 1939
- Builder: Deutsche Werke, Kiel
- Yard number: 273
- Laid down: 10 January 1940
- Launched: 24 August 1940
- Commissioned: 2 October 1940
- Fate: Sunk in the Gulf of Finland north of Hiiumaa, 10 August 1941

General characteristics
- Class & type: Type IID coastal submarine
- Displacement: 314 t (309 long tons) surfaced; 364 t (358 long tons) submerged
- Length: 43.97 m (144 ft 3 in) o/a; 29.80 m (97 ft 9 in) pressure hull
- Beam: 4.92 m (16 ft 2 in) (o/a); 4.00 m (13 ft 1 in) (pressure hull)
- Height: 8.40 m (27 ft 7 in)
- Draught: 3.93 m (12 ft 11 in)
- Installed power: 700 PS (510 kW; 690 bhp) (diesels); 410 PS (300 kW; 400 shp) (electric)
- Propulsion: 2 shafts; 2 × diesel engines; 2 × electric motors
- Speed: 12.7 knots (23.5 km/h; 14.6 mph) surfaced; 7.4 knots (13.7 km/h; 8.5 mph) submerged
- Range: 3,450 nmi (6,390 km; 3,970 mi) at 12 knots (22 km/h; 14 mph) surfaced; 56 nmi (104 km; 64 mi) at 4 knots (7.4 km/h; 4.6 mph) submerged
- Test depth: 80 m (260 ft)
- Complement: 3 officers, 22 men
- Armament: 3 × 53.3 cm (21 in) torpedo tubes; 5 × torpedoes or up to 12 TMA or 18 TMB mines; 1 × 2 cm (0.79 in) C/30 anti-aircraft gun

Service record
- Part of: 1st U-boat Flotilla; 2 October – 19 December 1940; 22nd U-boat Flotilla; 20 December 1940 – 10 August 1941
- Identification codes: M 37 886
- Commanders: Oblt.z.S. Friedrich von Hippel; 2 October – 16 November 1940; Kptlt. Gert von Mittelstaedt; 17 November 1940 – 10 August 1941
- Operations: 3 patrols: 1st patrol: 18 – 30 June 1941; 2nd patrol: 7 – 19 July 1941; 3rd patrol: 28 July – 10 August 1941
- Victories: 1 warships sunk (206 tons)

German submarine U-144 was a Type IID U-boat of Nazi Germany's Kriegsmarine during World War II. She was laid down on 10 January 1940 by Deutsche Werke of Kiel and commissioned on 2 October 1940.

== Design ==
German Type IID submarines were enlarged versions of the original Type IIs. U-144 had a displacement of 314 tonnes (309 long tons) when at the surface and 364 tonnes (358 long tons) while submerged. Officially, the standard tonnage was 250 long tons (250 t), however. The U-boat had a total length of 43.97 m (144 ft 3 in), a pressure hull length of 29.80 m (97 ft 9 in), a beam of 4.92 m (16 ft 2 in), a height of 8.40 m (27 ft 7 in), and a draught of 3.93 m (12 ft 11 in). The submarine was powered by two MWM RS 127 S four-stroke, six-cylinder diesel engines of 700 metric horsepower (510 kW; 690 shp) for cruising, two Siemens-Schuckert PG VV 322/36 double-acting electric motors producing a total of 410 metric horsepower (300 kW; 400 shp) for use while submerged. She had two shafts and two 0.85 m (3 ft) propellers. The boat was capable of operating at depths of up to 80–150 metres (260–490 ft).

The submarine had a maximum surface speed of 12.7 knots (23.5 km/h; 14.6 mph) and a maximum submerged speed of 7.4 knots (13.7 km/h; 8.5 mph). When submerged, the boat could operate for 35–42 nautical miles (65–78 km; 40–48 mi) at 4 knots (7.4 km/h; 4.6 mph); when surfaced, she could travel 3,800 nautical miles (7,000 km; 4,400 mi) at 8 knots (15 km/h; 9.2 mph). U-144 was fitted with three 53.3 cm (21 in) torpedo tubes at the bow, five torpedoes or up to twelve Type A torpedo mines, and a 2 cm (0.79 in) anti-aircraft gun. The boat had a complement of 25.

== Service history ==
In three patrols, U-144 sank one submarine for a total of 206 tons. The Soviet submarine M-78 was torpedoed and sunk, west of Windawa/Windau (Ventspils) in position 57°28′N 21°17′E on 23 June 1941.

== Fate ==
U-144 was sunk on 10 August 1941 in the Gulf of Finland north of Hiiumaa, in approximate position 59°N 23°E, by torpedoes from the Soviet submarine Shch-307. All 28 men inside were killed.

== Summary of raiding history ==
Date	Ship	Nationality	Tonnage (Note: Merchant ship tonnages are in gross register tons. Military vessels are listed by tons displacement.)	Fate
23 June 1941	M-78	Soviet Navy	206	Sunk

== Bibliography ==
- Busch, Rainer; Röll, Hans-Joachim (1999). German U-boat commanders of World War II : a biographical dictionary. Translated by Brooks, Geoffrey. London, Annapolis, Md: Greenhill Books, Naval Institute Press. ISBN 1-55750-186-6.
- Busch, Rainer; Röll, Hans-Joachim (1999). Deutsche U-Boot-Verluste von September 1939 bis Mai 1945 [German U-boat losses from September 1939 to May 1945]. Der U-Boot-Krieg (in German). Vol. IV. Hamburg, Berlin, Bonn: Mittler. ISBN 3-8132-0514-2.
- Gröner, Erich; Jung, Dieter; Maass, Martin (1991). U-boats and Mine Warfare Vessels. German Warships 1815–1945. Vol. 2. Translated by Thomas, Keith; Magowan, Rachel. London: Conway Maritime Press. ISBN 0-85177-593-4.
