= German submarine U-16 (1936) =

German World War II submarine

Coordinates: 51°9′N 1°28′E

History

Nazi Germany
- Name: U-16
- Ordered: 2 February 1935
- Builder: Deutsche Werke, Kiel
- Yard number: 251
- Laid down: 5 August 1935
- Launched: 28 April 1936
- Commissioned: 16 May 1936
- Fate: Sunk on 25 October 1939

General characteristics
- Class & type: Type IIB coastal submarine
- Displacement: 279 t (275 long tons) surfaced; 328 t (323 long tons) submerged
- Length: 42.70 m (140 ft 1 in) o/a; 27.80 m (91 ft 2 in) pressure hull
- Beam: 4.08 m (13 ft 5 in) (o/a); 4.00 m (13 ft 1 in) (pressure hull)
- Height: 8.60 m (28 ft 3 in)
- Draught: 3.90 m (12 ft 10 in)
- Installed power: 700 PS (510 kW; 690 bhp) (diesels); 410 PS (300 kW; 400 shp) (electric)
- Propulsion: 2 shafts; 2 × diesel engines; 2 × electric motors
- Speed: 13 knots (24 km/h; 15 mph) surfaced; 7 knots (13 km/h; 8.1 mph) submerged
- Range: 1,800 nmi (3,300 km; 2,100 mi) at 12 knots (22 km/h; 14 mph) surfaced; 35–43 nmi (65–80 km; 40–49 mi) at 4 knots (7.4 km/h; 4.6 mph) submerged
- Test depth: 80 m (260 ft)
- Complement: 3 officers, 22 men
- Armament: 3 × 53.3 cm (21 in) torpedo tubes; 5 × torpedoes or up to 12 TMA or 18 TMB mines; 1 × 2 cm (0.79 in) anti-aircraft gun

Service record
- Part of: 3rd U-boat Flotilla; 1 May 1936 – 1 August 1939; 1 September – 25 October 1939
- Identification codes: M 13 014
- Commanders: Kptlt. Heinz Beduhn; 1 May 1936 – 29 September 1937; Kptlt. Hannes Weingärtner; 30 September 1937 – 11 October 1939; Oblt.z.S. / Kptlt. Udo Behrens; 8 October 1937 – 17 October 1939; Kptlt. Horst Wellner; 12 – 25 October 1939
- Operations: 3 patrols: 1st patrol: a. 25 – 31 August 1939; b. 2 – 8 September 1939; 2nd patrol: 13 September – 5 October 1939; 3rd patrol: 18 – 25 October 1939
- Victories: 1 merchant ship sunk (3,378 GRT); 1 auxiliary warship sunk (57 GRT)

German submarine U-16 was a Type IIB U-boat of Nazi Germany's Kriegsmarine that served during World War II. It was launched on 28 April 1936, under the command of Heinz Beduhn, with a crew of 23. The last of its four commanders was Kapitänleutnant Horst Wellner.

== Design ==
German Type IIB submarines were enlarged versions of the original Type IIs. U-16 had a displacement of 279 tonnes (275 long tons) when at the surface and 328 tonnes (323 long tons) while submerged. Officially, the standard tonnage was 250 long tons (250 t), however. The U-boat had a total length of 42.70 m (140 ft 1 in), a pressure hull length of 28.20 m (92 ft 6 in), a beam of 4.08 m (13 ft 5 in), a height of 8.60 m (28 ft 3 in), and a draught of 3.90 m (12 ft 10 in). The submarine was powered by two MWM RS 127 S four-stroke, six-cylinder diesel engines of 700 metric horsepower (510 kW; 690 shp) for cruising, two Siemens-Schuckert PG VV 322/36 double-acting electric motors producing a total of 460 metric horsepower (340 kW; 450 shp) for use while submerged. She had two shafts and two 0.85 m (3 ft) propellers. The boat was capable of operating at depths of up to 80–150 metres (260–490 ft).

The submarine had a maximum surface speed of 12 knots (22 km/h; 14 mph) and a maximum submerged speed of 7 knots (13 km/h; 8.1 mph). When submerged, the boat could operate for 35–42 nautical miles (65–78 km; 40–48 mi) at 4 knots (7.4 km/h; 4.6 mph); when surfaced, she could travel 3,800 nautical miles (7,000 km; 4,400 mi) at 8 knots (15 km/h; 9.2 mph). U-16 was fitted with three 53.3 cm (21 in) torpedo tubes at the bow, five torpedoes or up to twelve Type A torpedo mines, and a 2 cm (0.79 in) anti-aircraft gun. The boat had a complement of twentyfive.

== Service history ==
From 2 September 1939, until 25 October 1939, U-16 took part in the laying of mines in open water in and around the English Channel, to hamper allied shipping. On 28 September 1939, U-16 sank the Swedish 3,378 GRT Nyland. The 57 GRT French Sainte Claire was sunk by one of the mines laid by U-16 on 21 November 1939.

== Fate ==
On 25 October 1939, U-16 was transiting the Dover Strait when it was attacked by HMS Puffin and HMS Cayton Wyke. Trying to avoid the depth charges from both ships, U-16 ran aground on the Goodwin Sands, an area that was notorious for both sides. U-16 was lost with all hands; other U-Boats were subsequently obliged to take the significantly longer route north of Scotland to the Western Approaches and the north Atlantic.

== Summary of raiding history ==
Date	Name	Nationality	Tonnage (Note: Merchant ship tonnages are in gross register tons. Military vessels are listed by tons displacement.)	Fate
28 September 1939	Nyland	Sweden	3,378	Sunk
21 November 1939	Ste. Claire	French Navy	57	Sunk (mine)

== Bibliography ==
- Busch, Rainer; Röll, Hans-Joachim (1999). German U-boat commanders of World War II : a biographical dictionary. Translated by Brooks, Geoffrey. London, Annapolis, Md: Greenhill Books, Naval Institute Press. ISBN 1-55750-186-6.
- Busch, Rainer; Röll, Hans-Joachim (1999). Deutsche U-Boot-Verluste von September 1939 bis Mai 1945 [German U-boat losses from September 1939 to May 1945]. Der U-Boot-Krieg (in German). Vol. IV. Hamburg, Berlin, Bonn: Mittler. ISBN 3-8132-0514-2.
- Gröner, Erich; Jung, Dieter; Maass, Martin (1991). U-boats and Mine Warfare Vessels. German Warships 1815–1945. Vol. 2. Translated by Thomas, Keith; Magowan, Rachel. London: Conway Maritime Press. ISBN 0-85177-593-4.
- Kemp, Paul (1999). Ships hit by U-Boats Destroyed - German Submarine Losses in the World Wars. London: Arms & Armour. ISBN 1-85409-515-3.
