= German submarine U-142 (1940) =

German World War II submarine

History

Nazi Germany
- Name: U-142
- Ordered: 25 September 1939
- Builder: Deutsche Werke, Kiel
- Yard number: 271
- Laid down: 12 December 1939
- Launched: 27 July 1940
- Commissioned: 4 September 1940
- Fate: Scuttled on 5 May 1945 at Wilhelmshaven

General characteristics
- Class & type: Type IID coastal submarine
- Displacement: 314 t (309 long tons) surfaced; 364 t (358 long tons) submerged
- Length: 43.97 m (144 ft 3 in) o/a; 29.80 m (97 ft 9 in) pressure hull
- Beam: 4.92 m (16 ft 2 in) (o/a); 4.00 m (13 ft 1 in) (pressure hull)
- Height: 8.40 m (27 ft 7 in)
- Draught: 3.93 m (12 ft 11 in)
- Installed power: 700 PS (510 kW; 690 bhp) (diesels); 410 PS (300 kW; 400 shp) (electric)
- Propulsion: 2 shafts; 2 × diesel engines; 2 × electric motors
- Speed: 12.7 knots (23.5 km/h; 14.6 mph) surfaced; 7.4 knots (13.7 km/h; 8.5 mph) submerged
- Range: 3,450 nmi (6,390 km; 3,970 mi) at 12 knots (22 km/h; 14 mph) surfaced; 56 nmi (104 km; 64 mi) at 4 knots (7.4 km/h; 4.6 mph) submerged
- Test depth: 80 m (260 ft)
- Complement: 3 officers, 22 men
- Armament: 3 × 53.3 cm (21 in) torpedo tubes; 5 × torpedoes or up to 12 TMA or 18 TMB mines; 1 × 2 cm (0.79 in) C/30 anti-aircraft gun

Service record
- Part of: 1st U-boat Flotilla; 4 September - 16 October 1940; 24th U-boat Flotilla; 17 October - 18 December 1940; 22nd U-boat Flotilla; 19 December 1940–5 May 1945
- Identification codes: M 32 187
- Commanders: Oblt.z.S. Nicolai Clausen; 4 September - 13 October 1940; Oblt.z.S. / Kptlt. Paul-Hugo Kettner; 14 October 1940 – 12 October 1941; Siegfried Lindke; 21 October 1941–17 March 1942; Oblt.z.S. Hans-Joachim Bertelsmann; 18 March - 12 September 1942; Oblt.z.S. Johann-Otto Krieg; 13 September - 24 December 1942; Oblt.z.S. Karl-Heinz Landahn; 25 December 1942–4 March 1944; Lt.z.S. / Oblt.z.S. Carl Schauroth; 5 March 1944–6 February 1945; Oblt.z.S. Friederich Baumgärtel; 7 February 1945–5 May 1945
- Operations: 3 patrols: 1st patrol: 21 June - 12 July 1941; 2nd patrol: 25 July - 9 August 1941; 3rd patrol: 28 - 31 August 1941
- Victories: None

German submarine U-142 was a Type IID U-boat of Nazi Germany's Kriegsmarine during World War II. Her keel was laid down on 12 December 1939 by Deutsche Werke in Kiel as yard number 271. She was launched on 27 July 1940 and commissioned on 4 September 1940 with Oberleutnant zur See Asmus Nicolai Clausen in command.

U-142 began her service life with the 1st U-boat Flotilla. She was then assigned to the 24th Flotilla and subsequently to the 22nd Flotilla where she conducted three patrols, but did not sink or damage any ships. She spent the rest of the war as a training vessel.

She was scuttled on 5 May 1945.

== Design ==
German Type IID submarines were enlarged versions of the original Type IIs. U-142 had a displacement of 314 tonnes (309 long tons) when at the surface and 364 tonnes (358 long tons) while submerged. Officially, the standard tonnage was 250 long tons (254 t), however. The U-boat had a total length of 43.97 m (144 ft 3 in), a pressure hull length of 29.80 m (97 ft 9 in), a beam of 4.92 m (16 ft 2 in), a height of 8.40 m (27 ft 7 in), and a draught of 3.93 m (12 ft 11 in). The submarine was powered by two MWM RS 127 S four-stroke, six-cylinder diesel engines of 700 metric horsepower (510 kW; 690 shp) for cruising, two Siemens-Schuckert PG VV 322/36 double-acting electric motors producing a total of 410 metric horsepower (300 kW; 400 shp) for use while submerged. She had two shafts and two 0.85 m (3 ft) propellers. The boat was capable of operating at depths of up to 80–150 metres (260–490 ft).

The submarine had a maximum surface speed of 12.7 knots (23.5 km/h; 14.6 mph) and a maximum submerged speed of 7.4 knots (13.7 km/h; 8.5 mph). When submerged, the boat could operate for 35–42 nautical miles (65–78 km; 40–48 mi) at 4 knots (7.4 km/h; 4.6 mph); when surfaced, she could travel 3,800 nautical miles (7,000 km; 4,400 mi) at 8 knots (15 km/h; 9.2 mph). U-142 was fitted with three 53.3 cm (21 in) torpedo tubes at the bow, five torpedoes or up to twelve Type A torpedo mines, and a 2 cm (0.79 in) anti-aircraft gun. The boat had a complement of 25.

== Operational career ==
=== First patrol ===
The boat's first patrol commenced with her departure from Gotenhafen, (now Gdynia in modern-day Poland) on 21 June 1941. She arrived in Oxhöft, (a suburb of Gdynia), without incident on 12 July.

=== Second patrol ===
Her second foray was also abortive, departing Oxhöft 25 July 1941 and arriving in Stormelö (in southwest Finland) on 9 August.

=== Third patrol ===
Her third sortie was equally barren, beginning in Stormelo on 28 August 1941 and ending in Gotenhafen on the 31st.

=== Loss ===
U-142 was scuttled in the Raederschleuse (lock) in Wilhelmshaven on 5 May 1945. The wreck was broken up on an unknown date.

== Bibliography ==
- Busch, Rainer; Röll, Hans-Joachim (1999). German U-boat commanders of World War II : a biographical dictionary. Translated by Brooks, Geoffrey. London, Annapolis, Md: Greenhill Books, Naval Institute Press. ISBN 1-55750-186-6.
- Busch, Rainer; Röll, Hans-Joachim (1999). Deutsche U-Boot-Verluste von September 1939 bis Mai 1945 [German U-boat losses from September 1939 to May 1945]. Der U-Boot-Krieg (in German). Vol. IV. Hamburg, Berlin, Bonn: Mittler. ISBN 3-8132-0514-2.
- Gröner, Erich; Jung, Dieter; Maass, Martin (1991). U-boats and Mine Warfare Vessels. German Warships 1815–1945. Vol. 2. Translated by Thomas, Keith; Magowan, Rachel. London: Conway Maritime Press. ISBN 0-85177-593-4.
