= German submarine U-1 (1935) =

German World War II submarine

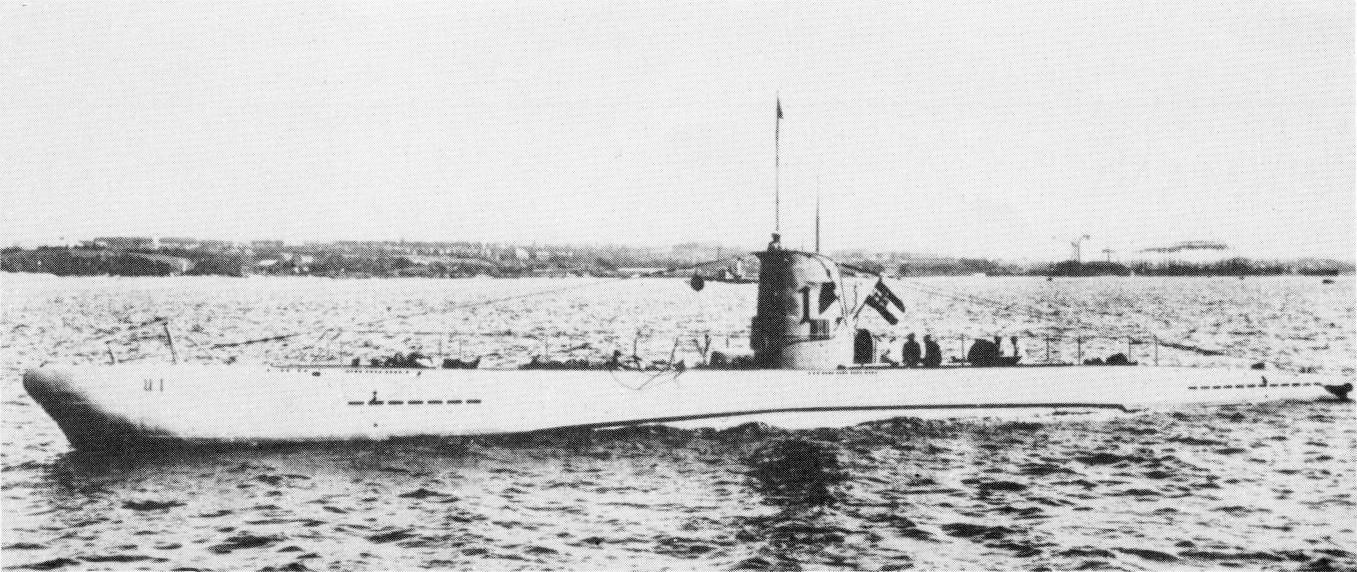
- Prewar picture of U-1

History

Nazi Germany
- Name: U-1
- Ordered: 2 February 1935
- Builder: Deutsche Werke, Kiel
- Cost: 1,500,000 Reichsmark
- Yard number: 236
- Laid down: 11 February 1935
- Launched: 15 June 1935
- Commissioned: 29 June 1935
- Fate: Sunk with all hands 6 April 1940 north of Terschelling by a British mine

General characteristics
- Class & type: Type IIA coastal submarine
- Displacement: 254 t (250 long tons) surfaced; 303 t (298 long tons) submerged; 381 t (375 long tons) total
- Length: 40.90 m (134 ft 2 in) (o/a); 27.80 m (91 ft 2 in) (pressure hull)
- Beam: 4.08 m (13 ft 5 in) (o/a); 4.00 m (13 ft 1 in) (pressure hull)
- Height: 8.60 m (28 ft 3 in)
- Draught: 3.83 m (12 ft 7 in)
- Installed power: 700 PS (510 kW; 690 shp) (diesels); 360 PS (260 kW; 360 shp) (electric)
- Propulsion: 2 × propeller shafts; 2 × 0.85 m (2 ft 9 in) three-bladed propellers; 2 × diesel engines; 2 × double-acting electric motors
- Speed: 13 knots (24 km/h; 15 mph) surfaced; 6.9 knots (12.8 km/h; 7.9 mph) submerged
- Range: 1,050 nmi (1,940 km; 1,210 mi) at 12 knots (22 km/h; 14 mph) surfaced; 35 nmi (65 km; 40 mi) at 4 knots (7.4 km/h; 4.6 mph) submerged
- Test depth: 80 m (260 ft)
- Complement: 3 officers, 22 men
- Armament: 3 × 53.3 cm (21 in) torpedo tubes; 5 × torpedoes or up to 12 TMA or 18 TMB mines; 1 × 2 cm (0.79 in) C/30 anti-aircraft gun

Service record
- Part of: U-boat School Flotilla; 1 July 1935 – 1 February 1940; 1 March – 6 April 1940
- Identification codes: M 27 893
- Commanders: Oblt.z.S. / Kptlt. Klaus Ewerth; 29 June 1935 – 30 September 1936; Kptlt. Alexander Gelhaar; 1 October 1936 – 2 February 1938; Unknown; 3 February – 28 October 1938; Kptlt. / K.Kapt. Jürgen Deecke; 29 October 1938 – 6 April 1940
- Operations: 2 patrols: 1st patrol: 15 – 29 March 1940; 2nd patrol: 4 – 6 April 1940
- Victories: None

German submarine U-1 was the first U-boat (or submarine) built for Nazi Germany's Kriegsmarine following Adolf Hitler's abrogation of the terms of the Treaty of Versailles in 1935, which banned Germany possessing a submarine force.

A Type IIA U-boat, she was built at the Deutsche Werke shipyards in Kiel, yard number 236, her keel being laid on 11 February 1935 amid celebration. She was commissioned on 29 June 1935 after a very rapid construction, and was manned by crews trained in the Netherlands.

== Design ==
German Type II submarines were based on the Finnish submarine Vesikko. U-1 had a displacement of 254 tonnes (250 long tons) when at the surface and 303 tonnes (298 long tons) while submerged. Officially, the standard tonnage was 250 long tons (254 t), however. The U-boat had a total length of 40.90 m (134 ft 2 in), a pressure hull length of 27.80 m (91 ft 2 in), a beam of 4.08 m (13 ft 5 in), a height of 8.60 m (28 ft 3 in), and a draught of 3.83 m (12 ft 7 in). The submarine was powered by two MWM RS 127 S four-stroke, six-cylinder diesel engines of 700 metric horsepower (510 kW; 690 shp) for cruising, two Siemens-Schuckert PG VV 322/36 double-acting electric motors producing a total of 360 metric horsepower (260 kW; 360 shp) for use while submerged. She had two shafts and two 0.85 m (3 ft) propellers. The boat was capable of operating at depths of up to 80–150 metres (260–490 ft).

The submarine had a maximum surface speed of 13 knots (24 km/h; 15 mph) and a maximum submerged speed of 6.9 knots (12.8 km/h; 7.9 mph). When submerged, the boat could operate for 35 nautical miles (65 km; 40 mi) at 4 knots (7.4 km/h; 4.6 mph); when surfaced, she could travel 1,600 nautical miles (3,000 km; 1,800 mi) at 8 knots (15 km/h; 9.2 mph). U-1 was fitted with three 53.3 cm (21 in) torpedo tubes at the bow, five torpedoes or up to twelve Type A torpedo mines, and a 2 cm (0.79 in) anti-aircraft gun. The boat had a complement of 25.

== Service history ==
Her pre-war service was unremarkable, but she did gain a reputation as a poor ship. Her rapid construction, combined with the inadequacy of the technology which was used to create her, made her uncomfortable, leaky and slow. When war came, there were already plans to shelve her and her immediate sister boats for use as training boats only.

Despite this however, owing to a shortage of available units she sailed on 29 March 1940 against British shipping operating off Norway, close to the limit of her effective operating range. She failed to find a target, but was sent out again on 4 April, in preparation for Operation Weserübung (the invasion of Norway).

== Fate ==
U-1 sent a brief radio signal on 6 April, giving her position, before she disappeared. She struck a mine in British minefield Field No. 7 in the North Sea north of Terschelling at position 54°14′N 05°07′E. The entire aft section of the boat was blown off and all hands lost. In June 2007, the wreck of U-1 was located by divers.

== Bibliography ==
- Busch, Rainer; Röll, Hans-Joachim (1997). Der U-Boot-Bau auf deutschen Werften. Der U-Boot-Krieg 1939-1945 (in German). Vol. II. Hamburg: Mittler. ISBN 3-8132-0509-6.
- Busch, Rainer; Röll, Hans-Joachim (1999a). Deutsche U-Boot-Verluste von September 1939 bis Mai 1945 [German U-boat losses from September 1939 to May 1945]. Der U-Boot-Krieg (in German). Vol. IV. Hamburg, Berlin, Bonn: Mittler. ISBN 3-8132-0514-2.
- Busch, Rainer; Röll, Hans-Joachim (1999b). German U-boat commanders of World War II : a biographical dictionary. Translated by Brooks, Geoffrey. London, Annapolis, Md: Greenhill Books, Naval Institute Press. ISBN 1-55750-186-6.
- Gröner, Erich; Jung, Dieter; Maass, Martin (1991). German Warships 1815–1945, U-boats and Mine Warfare Vessels. Vol. 2. Translated by Thomas, Keith; Magowan, Rachel. London: Conway Maritime Press. ISBN 0-85177-593-4.
- Kemp, Paul (1997). U-Boats Destroyed, German submarine losses in the World Wars. Arms and Armour. ISBN 1-85409-515-3.
- Rössler, Eberhard (1979). Die deutschen U-Boote und ihre Werften: eine Bilddokumentation über den deutschen U-Bootbau; in zwei Bänden (in German). Vol. I. Munich: Bernard & Graefe. ISBN 3-7637-5213-7.
- Sharpe, Peter (1998). U-Boat Fact File. Great Britain: Midland Publishing. ISBN 1-85780-072-9.
