= German submarine U-5 (1935) =

German World War II submarine

Coordinates: 54°40′N 19°45′E

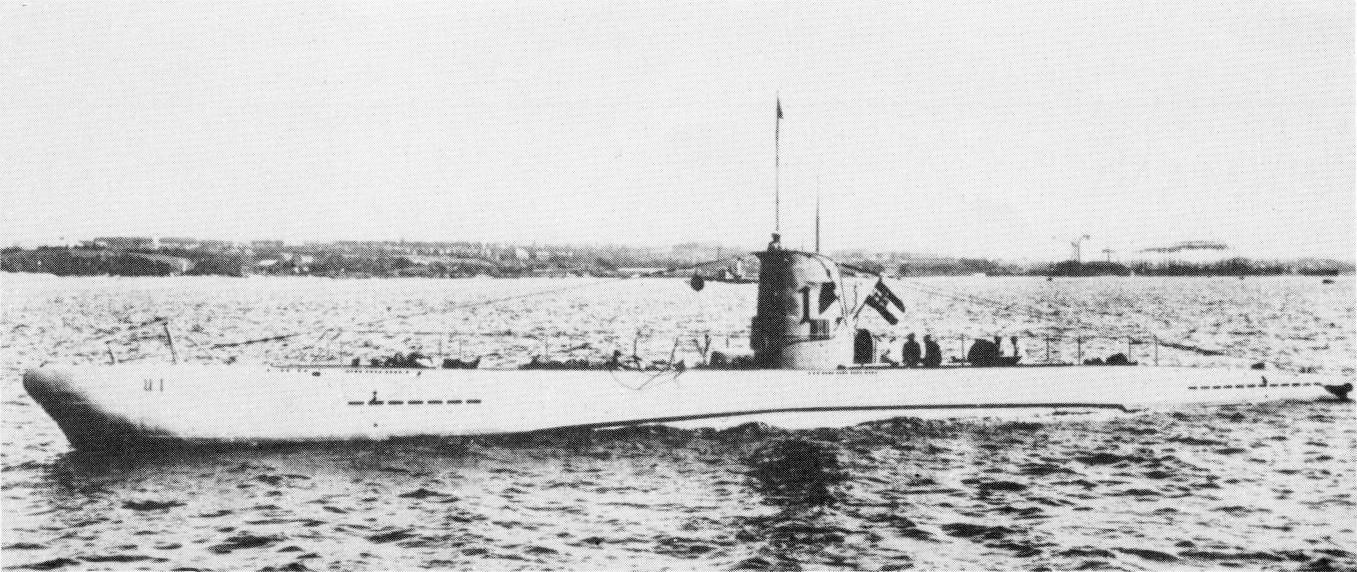
- U-1, the first Type II boat

History

Nazi Germany
- Name: U-5
- Ordered: 2 February 1935
- Builder: Deutsche Werke, Kiel
- Yard number: 240
- Laid down: 11 February 1935
- Launched: 14 August 1935
- Commissioned: 31 August 1935
- Fate: Sunk 19 March 1943, west of Pillau in a diving accident. 21 dead and 16 survivors

General characteristics
- Class & type: Type IIA coastal submarine
- Displacement: 254 t (250 long tons) surfaced; 303 t (298 long tons) submerged; 381 t (375 long tons) total
- Length: 40.90 m (134 ft 2 in) (o/a); 27.80 m (91 ft 2 in) (pressure hull)
- Beam: 4.08 m (13 ft 5 in) (o/a); 4.00 m (13 ft 1 in) (pressure hull)
- Height: 8.60 m (28 ft 3 in)
- Draught: 3.83 m (12 ft 7 in)
- Installed power: 700 PS (510 kW; 690 shp) (diesels); 360 PS (260 kW; 360 shp) (electric)
- Propulsion: 2 × propeller shafts; 2 × 0.85 m (2 ft 9 in) three-bladed propellers; 2 × diesel engines; 2 × double-acting electric motors
- Speed: 13 knots (24 km/h; 15 mph) surfaced; 6.9 knots (12.8 km/h; 7.9 mph) submerged
- Range: 1,050 nmi (1,940 km; 1,210 mi) at 12 knots (22 km/h; 14 mph) surfaced; 35 nmi (65 km; 40 mi) at 4 knots (7.4 km/h; 4.6 mph) submerged
- Test depth: 80 m (260 ft)
- Complement: 3 officers, 22 men
- Armament: 3 × 53.3 cm (21 in) torpedo tubes; 5 × torpedoes or up to 12 TMA or 18 TMB mines; 1 × 2 cm (0.79 in) C/30 anti-aircraft gun

Service record
- Part of: U-boat School Flotilla; 1 September 1935 – 1 September 1939; 1 October 1939 – 1 February 1940; 1 March 1940 – 1 April 1940; 1 May 1940 – 30 June 1940; 21st U-boat Flotilla; 1 July 1940 – 19 March 1943
- Identification codes: M 27 527
- Commanders: Oblt.z.S. / Kptlt. Rolf Dau; 31 August 1935 – 27 September 1936; Kptlt. Gerhard Glattes; 1 October 1936 – 2 February 1938; Oblt.z.S. / Kptlt. Günter Kutschmann; 3 February 1938 – 4 December 1939; Kptlt. Heinrich Lehmann-Willenbrock; 5 December 1939 – 11 August 1940; Oblt.z.S. / Kptlt. Herbert Opitz; 12 August 1940 – 27 March 1941; Oblt.z.S. Friedrich Bothe; 28 March 1941 – 6 January 1942; Oblt.z.S. Karl Friederich; 7 January – 23 March 1942; Lt.z.S. / Oblt.z.S. Hans-Dieter Mohs; 26 March – May 1942; Oblt.z.S. Kurt Pressel; May - 9 November 1942; Lt.z.S. / Oblt.z.S. Hermann Rahn; 10 November 1942 – 19 March 1943; Lt.z.S. Alfred Radermacher; March 1943
- Operations: 2 patrols: 1st patrol: 24 August – 8 September 1939; 2nd patrol: 4 – 19 April 1940
- Victories: No ships sunk or damaged

German submarine U-5 was a Type IIA U-boat of Nazi Germany's Kriegsmarine. She was laid down on 11 February 1935, launched on 14 August and commissioned 31 August that year, under Oberleutnant zur See Rolf Dau.

U-5 served mostly as a training boat from 1935 to 1940, but did see two wartime patrols in 1940. She was transferred to the 21st U-boat Flotilla on 1 July 1940.

U-5 was sunk on 19 March 1943 in a diving accident west of Pillau (now Baltiysk in Russia); 16 of the 37-man crew survived.

== Design ==
German Type II submarines were based on the Finnish submarine Vesikko. U-5 had a displacement of 254 tonnes (250 long tons) when at the surface and 303 tonnes (298 long tons) while submerged. Officially, the standard tonnage was 250 long tons (254 t), however. The U-boat had a total length of 40.90 m (134 ft 2 in), a pressure hull length of 27.80 m (91 ft 2 in), a beam of 4.08 m (13 ft 5 in), a height of 8.60 m (28 ft 3 in), and a draught of 3.83 m (12 ft 7 in). The submarine was powered by two MWM RS 127 S four-stroke, six-cylinder diesel engines of 700 metric horsepower (510 kW; 690 shp) for cruising, two Siemens-Schuckert PG VV 322/36 double-acting electric motors producing a total of 360 metric horsepower (260 kW; 360 shp) for use while submerged. She had two shafts and two 0.85 m (3 ft) propellers. The boat was capable of operating at depths of up to 80–150 metres (260–490 ft).

The submarine had a maximum surface speed of 13 knots (24 km/h; 15 mph) and a maximum submerged speed of 6.9 knots (12.8 km/h; 7.9 mph). When submerged, the boat could operate for 35 nautical miles (65 km; 40 mi) at 4 knots (7.4 km/h; 4.6 mph); when surfaced, she could travel 1,600 nautical miles (3,000 km; 1,800 mi) at 8 knots (15 km/h; 9.2 mph). U-5 was fitted with three 53.3 cm (21 in) torpedo tubes at the bow, five torpedoes or up to twelve Type A torpedo mines, and a 2 cm (0.79 in) anti-aircraft gun. The boat had a complement of 25.

== Bibliography ==
- Busch, Rainer; Röll, Hans-Joachim (1999a). German U-boat commanders of World War II : a biographical dictionary. Translated by Brooks, Geoffrey. London, Annapolis, Md: Greenhill Books, Naval Institute Press. ISBN 1-55750-186-6.
- Busch, Rainer; Röll, Hans-Joachim (1999b). Deutsche U-Boot-Verluste von September 1939 bis Mai 1945 [German U-boat losses from September 1939 to May 1945]. Der U-Boot-Krieg (in German). Vol. IV. Hamburg, Berlin, Bonn: Mittler. ISBN 3-8132-0514-2.
- Gröner, Erich; Jung, Dieter; Maass, Martin (1991). U-boats and Mine Warfare Vessels. German Warships 1815–1945. Vol. 2. Translated by Thomas, Keith; Magowan, Rachel. London: Conway Maritime Press. ISBN 0-85177-593-4.
- Sharpe, Peter (1998). U-Boat Fact File. Great Britain: Midland Publishing. ISBN 1-85780-072-9.
- Kemp, Paul (1999). U-Boats Destroyed - German Submarine Losses in the World Wars. London: Arms & Armour. ISBN 1-85409-515-3.
