= German submarine U-143 (1940) =

German World War II submarine

History

Nazi Germany
- Name: U-143
- Ordered: 25 September 1939
- Builder: Deutsche Werke, Kiel
- Yard number: 272
- Laid down: 3 January 1940
- Launched: 10 August 1940
- Commissioned: 18 September 1940
- Fate: Surrendered on 5 May 1945 at Heligoland; sunk on 22 December 1945 as part of Operation Deadlight

General characteristics
- Class & type: Type IID coastal submarine
- Displacement: 314 t (309 long tons) surfaced; 364 t (358 long tons) submerged
- Length: 43.97 m (144 ft 3 in) o/a; 29.80 m (97 ft 9 in) pressure hull
- Beam: 4.92 m (16 ft 2 in) o/a; 4.00 m (13 ft 1 in) pressure hull
- Height: 8.40 m (27 ft 7 in)
- Draught: 3.93 m (12 ft 11 in)
- Installed power: 700 PS (510 kW; 690 bhp) (diesels); 410 PS (300 kW; 400 shp) (electric)
- Propulsion: 2 shafts; 2 × diesel engines; 2 × electric motors
- Speed: 12.7 knots (23.5 km/h; 14.6 mph) surfaced; 7.4 knots (13.7 km/h; 8.5 mph) submerged
- Range: 3,450 nmi (6,390 km; 3,970 mi) at 12 knots (22 km/h; 14 mph) surfaced; 56 nmi (104 km; 64 mi) at 4 knots (7.4 km/h; 4.6 mph) submerged
- Test depth: 80 m (260 ft)
- Complement: 3 officers, 22 men
- Armament: 3 × 53.3 cm (21 in) torpedo tubes; 5 × torpedoes or up to 12 TMA or 18 TMB mines; 1 × 2 cm (0.79 in) C/30 anti-aircraft gun

Service record
- Part of: 1st U-boat Flotilla; 18 September - 2 November 1940; 24th U-boat Flotilla; 3 November - 31 December 1940; 22nd U-boat Flotilla; 1 January - 1 April 1941; 3rd U-boat Flotilla; 1 April - 12 September 1941; 22nd U-boat Flotilla; 13 September 1941 – 5 May 1945
- Identification codes: M 24 039
- Commanders: Oblt.z.S. / Kptlt. Ernst Mengerson; 18 September - 2 November 1940; Oblt.z.S. Helmut Möhlmann; 9 December 1940 – 19 March 1941; Oblt.z.S. Jürgen von Rosenstiel; 20 – 30 March 1941; Oblt.z.S. Harald Gelhaus; 31 March - 19 November 1941; Oblt.z.S. / Kptlt. Helmut Manseck; 19 November 1941 – 7 April 1942; Oblt.z.S. Gerhard Groth; 8 April - 14 December 1942; Oblt.z.S. Erwin Schwager; 15 December 1942 – 8 February 1943; Oblt.z.S. Hans Vogel; 9 February 1943 – 29 May 1944; Oblt.z.S. Walter Kasparek; 30 May 1944 – 5 May 1945
- Operations: 4 patrols: 1st patrol: a. 19 April - 13 May 1941; b. 13–18 May 1941; 2nd patrol: 9 - 29 June 1941; 3rd patrol: a. 6–14 July 1941; b. 17–21 July 1941; 4th patrol: 17 August - 12 September 1941
- Victories: 1 merchant ship sunk (1,409 GRT)

German submarine U-143 was a Type IID U-boat of Nazi Germany's Kriegsmarine during World War II. Her keel was laid down on 3 January 1940 by Deutsche Werke in Kiel as yard number 272. She was launched on 10 August 1940 and commissioned on 18 September under Kapitänleutnant Ernst Mengerson.

U-143 began her service life with the 1st U-boat Flotilla. She was then assigned to the 24th flotilla and subsequently to the 22nd flotilla where she conducted four patrols, sinking one ship of 1,409 gross register tons (GRT). She spent the rest of the war as a training vessel.

== Design ==
German Type IID submarines were enlarged versions of the original Type IIs. U-143 had a displacement of 314 tonnes (309 long tons) when at the surface and 364 tonnes (358 long tons) while submerged. Officially, the standard tonnage was 250 long tons (254 t), however. The U-boat had a total length of 43.97 m (144 ft 3 in), a pressure hull length of 29.80 m (97 ft 9 in), a beam of 4.92 m (16 ft 2 in), a height of 8.40 m (27 ft 7 in), and a draught of 3.93 m (12 ft 11 in). The submarine was powered by two MWM RS 127 S four-stroke, six-cylinder diesel engines of 700 metric horsepower (510 kW; 690 shp) for cruising, two Siemens-Schuckert PG VV 322/36 double-acting electric motors producing a total of 410 metric horsepower (300 kW; 400 shp) for use while submerged. She had two shafts and two 0.85 m (3 ft) propellers. The boat was capable of operating at depths of up to 80–150 metres (260–490 ft).

The submarine had a maximum surface speed of 12.7 knots (23.5 km/h; 14.6 mph) and a maximum submerged speed of 7.4 knots (13.7 km/h; 8.5 mph). When submerged, the boat could operate for 35–42 nautical miles (65–78 km; 40–48 mi) at 4 knots (7.4 km/h; 4.6 mph); when surfaced, she could travel 3,800 nautical miles (7,000 km; 4,400 mi) at 8 knots (15 km/h; 9.2 mph). U-143 was fitted with three 53.3 cm (21 in) torpedo tubes at the bow, five torpedoes or up to twelve Type A torpedo mines, and a 2 cm (0.79 in) anti-aircraft gun. The boat had a complement of 25.

== Operational career ==
=== First patrol ===
U-143's first patrol took her along the Norwegian coast, before crossing the North Sea and passing through the gap between the Faroe and Shetland Islands towards Iceland.

=== Second and third patrols ===
Following a transit voyage from Bergen in Norway, she left Kiel on 9 June 1941, travelling to much the same area as on her first sortie.

Her third foray was equally uneventful.

=== Fourth patrol and fate ===
On her fourth patrol, the boat sank the Inger on 23 August 1941 about 30 nmi (56 km; 35 mi) northwest of the Butt of Lewis (in the Outer Hebrides of Scotland).

She surrendered on 5 May 1945 in Heligoland, was transferred to Wilhelmshaven and then to Loch Ryan for Operation Deadlight. She was sunk on 22 December at 55°58′N 9°35′W.

== Summary of raiding history ==
| Date | Ship | Nationality | Tonnage (GRT) | Fate |
|---|---|---|---|---|
| 23 August 1941 | Inger | Norway | 1,409 | Sunk |

== Bibliography ==
- Busch, Rainer; Röll, Hans-Joachim (1999). German U-boat commanders of World War II : a biographical dictionary. Translated by Brooks, Geoffrey. London, Annapolis, Md: Greenhill Books, Naval Institute Press. ISBN 1-55750-186-6.
- Busch, Rainer; Röll, Hans-Joachim (1999). Deutsche U-Boot-Verluste von September 1939 bis Mai 1945 [German U-boat losses from September 1939 to May 1945]. Der U-Boot-Krieg (in German). Vol. IV. Hamburg, Berlin, Bonn: Mittler. ISBN 3-8132-0514-2.
- Blair, Clay (1996). Hitler's U-Boat War: The Hunters 1939–1942. New York: Random House. ISBN 0-394-58839-8.
- Gröner, Erich; Jung, Dieter; Maass, Martin (1991). U-boats and Mine Warfare Vessels. German Warships 1815–1945. Vol. 2. Translated by Thomas, Keith; Magowan, Rachel. London: Conway Maritime Press. ISBN 0-85177-593-4.
