= German submarine U-150 (1940) =

German World War II submarine

History

Nazi Germany
- Name: U-150
- Ordered: 25 September 1939
- Builder: Deutsche Werke, Kiel
- Yard number: 279
- Laid down: 25 May 1940
- Launched: 19 October 1940
- Commissioned: 27 November 1940
- Fate: Surrendered at Heligoland on 5 May 1945, sunk on 21 December 1945 as part of Operation Deadlight

General characteristics
- Class & type: Type IID coastal submarine
- Displacement: 314 t (309 long tons) surfaced; 364 t (358 long tons) submerged
- Length: 43.97 m (144 ft 3 in) o/a; 29.80 m (97 ft 9 in) pressure hull
- Beam: 4.92 m (16 ft 2 in) o/a; 4.00 m (13 ft 1 in) pressure hull
- Height: 8.40 m (27 ft 7 in)
- Draught: 3.93 m (12 ft 11 in)
- Installed power: 700 PS (510 kW; 690 bhp) (diesels); 410 PS (300 kW; 400 shp) (electric)
- Propulsion: 2 shafts; 2 × diesel engines; 2 × electric motors
- Speed: 12.7 knots (23.5 km/h; 14.6 mph) surfaced; 7.4 knots (13.7 km/h; 8.5 mph) submerged
- Range: 3,450 nmi (6,390 km; 3,970 mi) at 12 knots (22 km/h; 14 mph) surfaced; 56 nmi (104 km; 64 mi) at 4 knots (7.4 km/h; 4.6 mph) submerged
- Test depth: 80 m (260 ft)
- Complement: 3 officers, 22 men
- Armament: 3 × 53.3 cm (21 in) torpedo tubes; 5 × torpedoes or up to 12 TMA or 18 TMB mines; 1 × 2 cm (0.79 in) C/30 anti-aircraft gun

Service record
- Part of: 1st U-boat Flotilla; 27 November – 31 December 1940; 22nd U-boat Flotilla; 1 January 1941 – 31 March 1945; 31st U-boat Flotilla; 1 April 1945 – 5 May 1945
- Identification codes: M 19 550
- Commanders: Lt.z.S. / Oblt.z.S. Hinrich Kelling; 27 November 1940 – 31 August 1942; Lt.z.S. / Oblt.z.S. Hermann Schultz; 9 January 1942 – May 1944; Oblt.z.S.d.R Emil Ranzau; May - 7 June 1944; Lt.z.S. / Oblt.z.S. Hunold Ahlefeld; 16 July – 21 December 1944; Lt.z.S. / Oblt.z.S. Hans-Helmut Anschütz; 22 December 1944 – 31 March 1945; Oblt.z.S. Jürgen Kriegshammer; 1 April – 5 May 1945
- Operations: None
- Victories: None

German submarine U-150 was a Type IID U-boat of Nazi Germany's Kriegsmarine during World War II. Her keel was laid down on 25 May 1940 by Deutsche Werke in Kiel as yard number 279. She was launched on 19 October 1940 and commissioned on 27 November with Hinrich Kelling in command.

U-146 began her service life with the 1st U-boat Flotilla. She was then assigned to the 22nd flotilla and subsequently to the 31st flotilla. She spent the war as a training vessel.

== Design ==
German Type IID submarines were enlarged versions of the original Type IIs. U-150 had a displacement of 314 tonnes (309 long tons) when at the surface and 364 tonnes (358 long tons) while submerged. Officially, the standard tonnage was 250 long tons (254 t), however. The U-boat had a total length of 43.97 m (144 ft 3 in), a pressure hull length of 29.80 m (97 ft 9 in), a beam of 4.92 m (16 ft 2 in), a height of 8.40 m (27 ft 7 in), and a draught of 3.93 m (12 ft 11 in). The submarine was powered by two MWM RS 127 S four-stroke, six-cylinder diesel engines of 700 metric horsepower (510 kW; 690 shp) for cruising, two Siemens-Schuckert PG VV 322/36 double-acting electric motors producing a total of 410 metric horsepower (300 kW; 400 shp) for use while submerged. She had two shafts and two 0.85 m (3 ft) propellers. The boat was capable of operating at depths of up to 80–150 metres (260–490 ft).

The submarine had a maximum surface speed of 12.7 knots (23.5 km/h; 14.6 mph) and a maximum submerged speed of 7.4 knots (13.7 km/h; 8.5 mph). When submerged, the boat could operate for 35–42 nautical miles (65–78 km; 40–48 mi) at 4 knots (7.4 km/h; 4.6 mph); when surfaced, she could travel 3,800 nautical miles (7,000 km; 4,400 mi) at 8 knots (15 km/h; 9.2 mph). U-150 was fitted with three 53.3 cm (21 in) torpedo tubes at the bow, five torpedoes or up to twelve Type A torpedo mines, and a 2 cm (0.79 in) anti-aircraft gun. The boat had a complement of 25.

== Fate ==
She was surrendered at the German island of Heligoland on 5 May 1945, taken to Loch Ryan in Scotland and sunk by gunfire from the destroyer HMS Onslaught and the patrol sloop HMS Powey as part of Operation Deadlight on 21 December 1945. She sank at 56°04′N 09°35′W.

== Bibliography ==
- Busch, Rainer; Röll, Hans-Joachim (1999). German U-boat commanders of World War II : a biographical dictionary. Translated by Brooks, Geoffrey. London, Annapolis, Md: Greenhill Books, Naval Institute Press. ISBN 1-55750-186-6.
- Busch, Rainer; Röll, Hans-Joachim (1999). Deutsche U-Boot-Verluste von September 1939 bis Mai 1945 [German U-boat losses from September 1939 to May 1945]. Der U-Boot-Krieg (in German). Vol. IV. Hamburg, Berlin, Bonn: Mittler. ISBN 3-8132-0514-2.
- Gröner, Erich; Jung, Dieter; Maass, Martin (1991). U-boats and Mine Warfare Vessels. German Warships 1815–1945. Vol. 2. Translated by Thomas, Keith; Magowan, Rachel. London: Conway Maritime Press. ISBN 0-85177-593-4.
