= German submarine U-12 (1935) =

German World War II submarine

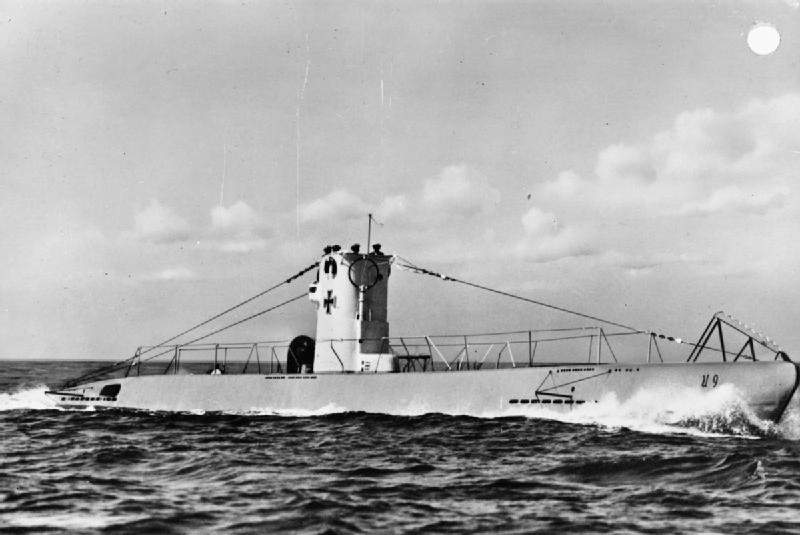
- U-9, a typical Type IIB boat

History

Nazi Germany
- Name: U-12
- Ordered: 20 July 1934
- Builder: Germaniawerft, Kiel
- Yard number: 546
- Laid down: 20 May 1935
- Launched: 11 September 1935
- Commissioned: 30 September 1935
- Fate: Sunk 8 October 1939 in the English Channel near Dover. 27 dead

General characteristics
- Class & type: Type IIB coastal submarine
- Displacement: 279 t (275 long tons) surfaced; 328 t (323 long tons) submerged
- Length: 42.70 m (140 ft 1 in) o/a; 27.80 m (91 ft 2 in) pressure hull
- Beam: 4.08 m (13 ft 5 in) (o/a); 4.00 m (13 ft 1 in) (pressure hull)
- Height: 8.60 m (28 ft 3 in)
- Draught: 3.90 m (12 ft 10 in)
- Installed power: 700 PS (510 kW; 690 bhp) (diesels); 410 PS (300 kW; 400 shp) (electric)
- Propulsion: 2 shafts; 2 × diesel engines; 2 × electric motors
- Speed: 13 knots (24 km/h; 15 mph) surfaced; 7 knots (13 km/h; 8.1 mph) submerged
- Range: 1,800 nmi (3,300 km; 2,100 mi) at 12 knots (22 km/h; 14 mph) surfaced; 35–43 nmi (65–80 km; 40–49 mi) at 4 knots (7.4 km/h; 4.6 mph) submerged
- Test depth: 80 m (260 ft)
- Complement: 3 officers, 22 men
- Armament: 3 × 53.3 cm (21 in) torpedo tubes; 5 × torpedoes or up to 12 TMA or 18 TMB mines; 1 × 2 cm (0.79 in) C/30 anti-aircraft gun

Service record
- Part of: 3rd U-boat Flotilla; 1 September 1935 – 1 August 1939; 1 September 1939 – 8 October 1939
- Identification codes: M 17 865
- Commanders: Oblt.z.S. / Kptlt. Werner von Schmidt; 30 September 1935 – 1 October 1937; Kptlt. Hans Pauckstadt; December 1936 – 1 October 1937; Kptlt. Dietrich von der Ropp; 1 October 1937 – 8 October 1939
- Operations: 2 patrols: 1st patrol: a. 25 August – 9 September 1939; b. 18 – 19 September 1939; 2nd patrol: 23 September – 8 October 1939
- Victories: No ships sunk or damaged

German submarine U-12 was a Type IIB U-boat of Nazi Germany's Kriegsmarine laid down on 20 May 1935 by Germaniawerft at Kiel and commissioned on 30 September.

== Design ==
German Type IIB submarines were enlarged versions of the original Type IIs. U-12 had a displacement of 279 tonnes (275 long tons) when at the surface and 328 tonnes (323 long tons) while submerged. Officially, the standard tonnage was 250 long tons (250 t), however. The U-boat had a total length of 42.70 m (140 ft 1 in), a pressure hull length of 28.20 m (92 ft 6 in), a beam of 4.08 m (13 ft 5 in), a height of 8.60 m (28 ft 3 in), and a draught of 3.90 m (12 ft 10 in). The submarine was powered by two MWM RS 127 S four-stroke, six-cylinder diesel engines of 700 metric horsepower (510 kW; 690 shp) for cruising, two Siemens-Schuckert PG VV 322/36 double-acting electric motors producing a total of 460 metric horsepower (340 kW; 450 shp) for use while submerged. She had two shafts and two 0.85 m (3 ft) propellers. The boat was capable of operating at depths of up to 80–150 metres (260–490 ft).

The submarine had a maximum surface speed of 12 knots (22 km/h; 14 mph) and a maximum submerged speed of 7 knots (13 km/h; 8.1 mph). When submerged, the boat could operate for 35–42 nautical miles (65–78 km; 40–48 mi) at 4 knots (7.4 km/h; 4.6 mph); when surfaced, she could travel 3,800 nautical miles (7,000 km; 4,400 mi) at 8 knots (15 km/h; 9.2 mph). U-12 was fitted with three 53.3 cm (21 in) torpedo tubes at the bow, five torpedoes or up to twelve Type A torpedo mines, and a 2 cm (0.79 in) anti-aircraft gun. The boat had a complement of twentyfive.

== Fate ==
She was sunk 8 October 1939 by a mine, near Dover in the English Channel. Her exact position is not known but it is at approximately 51°10′N 01°30′E. All 27 of her crew died. The body of the commanding officer, Kapitänleutnant Dietrich von der Ropp, was washed ashore on the French coast near Dunkirk on 29 October 1939.

In 2002, the wreck was nominated by the German government to be designated as a protected place under the Protection of Military Remains Act 1986. This vessel was designated as a representative of all others lost within UK jurisdiction.

== Bibliography ==
- Busch, Rainer; Röll, Hans-Joachim (1999). German U-boat commanders of World War II : a biographical dictionary. Translated by Brooks, Geoffrey. London, Annapolis, Md: Greenhill Books, Naval Institute Press. ISBN 1-55750-186-6.
- Busch, Rainer; Röll, Hans-Joachim (1999). Deutsche U-Boot-Verluste von September 1939 bis Mai 1945 [German U-boat losses from September 1939 to May 1945]. Der U-Boot-Krieg (in German). Vol. IV. Hamburg, Berlin, Bonn: Mittler. ISBN 3-8132-0514-2.
- Gröner, Erich; Jung, Dieter; Maass, Martin (1991). U-boats and Mine Warfare Vessels. German Warships 1815–1945. Vol. 2. Translated by Thomas, Keith; Magowan, Rachel. London: Conway Maritime Press. ISBN 0-85177-593-4.
