= German submarine U-147 (1940) =

German World War II submarine

History

Nazi Germany
- Name: U-147
- Ordered: 25 September 1939
- Builder: Deutsche Werke, Kiel
- Yard number: 276
- Laid down: 10 April 1940
- Launched: 16 November 1940
- Commissioned: 11 December 1940
- Fate: Sunk on 2 June 1941

General characteristics
- Class & type: Type IID coastal submarine
- Displacement: 314 t (309 long tons) surfaced; 364 t (358 long tons) submerged
- Length: 43.97 m (144 ft 3 in) o/a; 29.80 m (97 ft 9 in) pressure hull
- Beam: 4.92 m (16 ft 2 in) o/a; 4.00 m (13 ft 1 in) pressure hull
- Height: 8.40 m (27 ft 7 in)
- Draught: 3.93 m (12 ft 11 in)
- Installed power: 700 PS (510 kW; 690 bhp) (diesels); 410 PS (300 kW; 400 shp) (electric)
- Propulsion: 2 shafts; 2 × diesel engines; 2 × electric motors
- Speed: 12.7 knots (23.5 km/h; 14.6 mph) surfaced; 7.4 knots (13.7 km/h; 8.5 mph) submerged
- Range: 3,450 nmi (6,390 km; 3,970 mi) at 12 knots (22 km/h; 14 mph) surfaced; 56 nmi (104 km; 64 mi) at 4 knots (7.4 km/h; 4.6 mph) submerged
- Test depth: 80 m (260 ft)
- Complement: 3 officers, 22 men
- Armament: 3 × 53.3 cm (21 in) torpedo tubes; 5 × torpedoes or up to 12 TMA or 18 TMB mines; 1 × 2 cm (0.79 in) C/30 anti-aircraft gun

Service record
- Part of: 1st U-boat Flotilla; 11 – 19 December 1940; 22nd U-boat Flotilla; 20 December 1940 – 1 February 1941; 3rd U-boat Flotilla; 1 February – 2 June 1941
- Identification codes: M 19 049
- Commanders: Kptlt. Reinhard Hardegen; 11 December 1940 – 4 April 1941; Oblt.z.S. Eberhard Wetjen; 5 April – 2 June 1941
- Operations: 3 patrols: 1st patrol: 22 February – 12 March 1941; 2nd patrol: 16 April – 11 May 1941; 3rd patrol: 24 May – 2 June 1941
- Victories: 2 merchant ships sunk (6,145 GRT); 1 merchant ship total loss (2,491 GRT); 1 merchant ship damaged (4,996 GRT)

German submarine U-147 was a Type IID U-boat of the German Navy (Kriegsmarine) during World War II. She was laid down on 10 April 1940 at Deutsche Werke in Kiel as yard number 276, launched on 16 November 1940 and commissioned on 11 December under the command of Kapitänleutnant Reinhard Hardegen.

== Design ==
German Type IID submarines were enlarged versions of the original Type IIs. U-147 had a displacement of 314 tonnes (309 long tons) when at the surface and 364 tonnes (358 long tons) while submerged. Officially, the standard tonnage was 250 long tons (250 t), however. The U-boat had a total length of 43.97 m (144 ft 3 in), a pressure hull length of 29.80 m (97 ft 9 in), a beam of 4.92 m (16 ft 2 in), a height of 8.40 m (27 ft 7 in), and a draught of 3.93 m (12 ft 11 in). The submarine was powered by two MWM RS 127 S four-stroke, six-cylinder diesel engines of 700 metric horsepower (510 kW; 690 shp) for cruising, two Siemens-Schuckert PG VV 322/36 double-acting electric motors producing a total of 410 metric horsepower (300 kW; 400 shp) for use while submerged. She had two shafts and two 0.85 m (3 ft) propellers. The boat was capable of operating at depths of up to 80–150 metres (260–490 ft).

The submarine had a maximum surface speed of 12.7 knots (23.5 km/h; 14.6 mph) and a maximum submerged speed of 7.4 knots (13.7 km/h; 8.5 mph). When submerged, the boat could operate for 35–42 nautical miles (65–78 km; 40–48 mi) at 4 knots (7.4 km/h; 4.6 mph); when surfaced, she could travel 3,800 nautical miles (7,000 km; 4,400 mi) at 8 knots (15 km/h; 9.2 mph). U-147 was fitted with three 53.3 cm (21 in) torpedo tubes at the bow, five torpedoes or up to twelve Type A torpedo mines, and a 2 cm (0.79 in) anti-aircraft gun. The boat had a complement of 25.

== Operational career ==
=== First patrol ===
U-147's first patrol was preceded by a short trip from Kiel to Bergen in Norway on 22 February 1941. She then left the Nordic port on 22 February and headed for the Atlantic north and west of Scotland. She sank the Norwegian freighter Augvald, a straggler from convoy HX 109, about 72 nmi (133 km; 83 mi) north north-west of Ness in the Outer Hebrides on 2 March. Following this patrol, Hardegen took command of U-123 and was succeeded by his first watch officer, Eberhard Wetjen.

She arrived back in Kiel on 12 March.

=== Second patrol ===
The boat's second foray was similar to her first, except it started from Kiel. She sank another Norwegian ship, Rimfakse, about 130 nmi (240 km; 150 mi) north-west of Scotland on 27 April 1941. She sank no other ships and put into Bergen on 11 May.

=== Third patrol and loss ===
U-147's third and final patrol began on 24 May 1941. A week later, she torpedoed the British freighter Gravelines northwest of the Bloody Foreland (western Ireland), which broke in two and was declared a total loss; the forward part of the ship was towed to the Clyde and scrapped. On 2 June U-147 encountered convoy OB 239 north-west of Ireland and attacked alone (a decision which historian Clay Blair described as "bold"). She damaged one ship (Mokambo) before being sunk to the west of Skerryvore with all hands by convoy escorts, the destroyer HMS Wanderer and the corvette HMS Periwinkle.

== Summary of raiding history ==
Date	Ship	Nationality	Tonnage (GRT)	Convoy	Fate and location
2 March 1941	Augvald	Norway	4,811	HX 109	Sunk at 59°30′N 07°30′W
27 April 1941	Rimfakse	Norway	1,334		Sunk at 60°10′N 08°54′W
31 May 1941	Gravelines	United Kingdom	2,491	HX 127	Total loss; stern sank at 56°0′N 11°13′W
2 June 1941	Mokambo	Belgium	4,996	OB 329	Damaged at 56°38′N 10°24′W

== Cultural references ==
U-147 is erroneously named as the German submarine setting of the 12 May 1959 episode, "The Haunted U-Boat" of the American supernatural anthology series Alcoa Presents: One Step Beyond.

== Bibliography ==
- Busch, Rainer; Röll, Hans-Joachim (1999). German U-boat commanders of World War II : a biographical dictionary. Translated by Brooks, Geoffrey. London, Annapolis, Md: Greenhill Books, Naval Institute Press. ISBN 1-55750-186-6.
- Busch, Rainer; Röll, Hans-Joachim (1999). Deutsche U-Boot-Verluste von September 1939 bis Mai 1945 [German U-boat losses from September 1939 to May 1945]. Der U-Boot-Krieg (in German). Vol. IV. Hamburg, Berlin, Bonn: Mittler. ISBN 3-8132-0514-2.
- Blair, Clay (1996). Hitler's U-Boat War: The Hunters 1939–1942. New York: Random House. ISBN 0-394-58839-8.
- Gröner, Erich; Jung, Dieter; Maass, Martin (1991). U-boats and Mine Warfare Vessels. German Warships 1815–1945. Vol. 2. Translated by Thomas, Keith; Magowan, Rachel. London: Conway Maritime Press. ISBN 0-85177-593-4.
- Kemp, Paul (1999). U-Boats Destroyed – German Submarine Losses in the World Wars. Arms & Armour. ISBN 1-85409-515-3.
