= German submarine U-145 (1940) =

German World War II submarine

Coordinates: 55°47′N 9°56′W

History

Nazi Germany
- Name: U-145
- Ordered: 25 September 1939
- Builder: Deutsche Werke, Kiel
- Yard number: 274
- Laid down: 29 March 1940
- Launched: 21 September 1940
- Commissioned: 16 October 1940
- Fate: Surrendered on 5 May 1945; sunk as part of Operation Deadlight on 22 December 1945

General characteristics
- Class & type: Type IID coastal submarine
- Displacement: 314 t (309 long tons) surfaced; 364 t (358 long tons) submerged
- Length: 43.97 m (144 ft 3 in) o/a; 29.80 m (97 ft 9 in) pressure hull
- Beam: 4.92 m (16 ft 2 in) (o/a); 4.00 m (13 ft 1 in) (pressure hull)
- Height: 8.40 m (27 ft 7 in)
- Draught: 3.93 m (12 ft 11 in)
- Installed power: 700 PS (510 kW; 690 bhp) (diesels); 410 PS (300 kW; 400 shp) (electric)
- Propulsion: 2 shafts; 2 × diesel engines; 2 × electric motors
- Speed: 12.7 knots (23.5 km/h; 14.6 mph) surfaced; 7.4 knots (13.7 km/h; 8.5 mph) submerged
- Range: 3,450 nmi (6,390 km; 3,970 mi) at 12 knots (22 km/h; 14 mph) surfaced; 56 nmi (104 km; 64 mi) at 4 knots (7.4 km/h; 4.6 mph) submerged
- Test depth: 80 m (260 ft)
- Complement: 3 officers, 22 men
- Armament: 3 × 53.3 cm (21 in) torpedo tubes; 5 × torpedoes or up to 12 TMA or 18 TMB mines; 1 × 2 cm (0.79 in) C/30 anti-aircraft gun

Service record
- Part of: 1st U-boat Flotilla; 16 October - 18 December 1940; 22nd U-boat Flotilla; 19 December 1940 - 5 May 1945
- Identification codes: M 26 997
- Commanders: Oblt.z.S. Heinrich Driver; 16 October - 18 December 1940; Kptlt. Rudolf Franzius; 19 December 1940 - 21 October 1941; Oblt.z.S. Heinz Schomburg; 22 October - 25 November 1941; Oblt.z.S. Reimar Ziesmer; 26 November 1941 - 14 December 1942; Lt.z.S. / Oblt.z.S. Otto Hübschen; 15 December 1942 - 12 March 1944; Oblt.z.S. Horst Dieter Hübsch; 13 March - 26 November 1944; Oblt.z.S. Friederich-Karl Görner; 27 November 1944 - 5 May 1945
- Operations: 3 patrols: 1st patrol: 18 June - 6 July 1941; 2nd patrol: 14 – 29 July 1941; 3rd patrol: 9 – 28 August 1941
- Victories: None

German submarine U-145 was a Type IID U-boat of Nazi Germany's Kriegsmarine during World War II. She was laid down on 29 March 1940 at Deutsche Werke in Kiel as yard number 274, launched on 21 September and commissioned under the command of Oberleutnant zur See Heinrich Driver.

Her service was carried out, first with the 1st U-boat Flotilla then the 22nd flotilla; she stayed with the latter organization for most of her career.

== Design ==
German Type IID submarines were enlarged versions of the original Type IIs. U-145 had a displacement of 314 tonnes (309 long tons) when at the surface and 364 tonnes (358 long tons) while submerged. Officially, the standard tonnage was 250 long tons (254 t), however. The U-boat had a total length of 43.97 m (144 ft 3 in), a pressure hull length of 29.80 m (97 ft 9 in), a beam of 4.92 m (16 ft 2 in), a height of 8.40 m (27 ft 7 in), and a draught of 3.93 m (12 ft 11 in). The submarine was powered by two MWM RS 127 S four-stroke, six-cylinder diesel engines of 700 metric horsepower (510 kW; 690 shp) for cruising, two Siemens-Schuckert PG VV 322/36 double-acting electric motors producing a total of 410 metric horsepower (300 kW; 400 shp) for use while submerged. She had two shafts and two 0.85 m (3 ft) propellers. The boat was capable of operating at depths of up to 80–150 metres (260–490 ft).

The submarine had a maximum surface speed of 12.7 knots (23.5 km/h; 14.6 mph) and a maximum submerged speed of 7.4 knots (13.7 km/h; 8.5 mph). When submerged, the boat could operate for 35–42 nautical miles (65–78 km; 40–48 mi) at 4 knots (7.4 km/h; 4.6 mph); when surfaced, she could travel 3,800 nautical miles (7,000 km; 4,400 mi) at 8 knots (15 km/h; 9.2 mph). U-145 was fitted with three 53.3 cm (21 in) torpedo tubes at the bow, five torpedoes or up to twelve Type A torpedo mines, and a 2 cm (0.79 in) anti-aircraft gun. The boat had a complement of 25.

== Operational career ==
U-145 did not sink or damage any ships, but she conducted three war patrols all in 1941.

== Bibliography ==
- Busch, Rainer; Röll, Hans-Joachim (1999). German U-boat commanders of World War II : a biographical dictionary. Translated by Brooks, Geoffrey. London, Annapolis, Md: Greenhill Books, Naval Institute Press. ISBN 1-55750-186-6.
- Busch, Rainer; Röll, Hans-Joachim (1999). Deutsche U-Boot-Verluste von September 1939 bis Mai 1945 [German U-boat losses from September 1939 to May 1945]. Der U-Boot-Krieg (in German). Vol. IV. Hamburg, Berlin, Bonn: Mittler. ISBN 3-8132-0514-2.
- Blair, Clay (1996). Hitler's U-Boat War: The Hunters 1939–1942. New York: Random House. ISBN 0-394-58839-8.
- Gröner, Erich; Jung, Dieter; Maass, Martin (1991). U-boats and Mine Warfare Vessels. German Warships 1815–1945. Vol. 2. Translated by Thomas, Keith; Magowan, Rachel. London: Conway Maritime Press. ISBN 0-85177-593-4.
