= Type II submarine =

Coastal submarine class of the Kriegsmarine

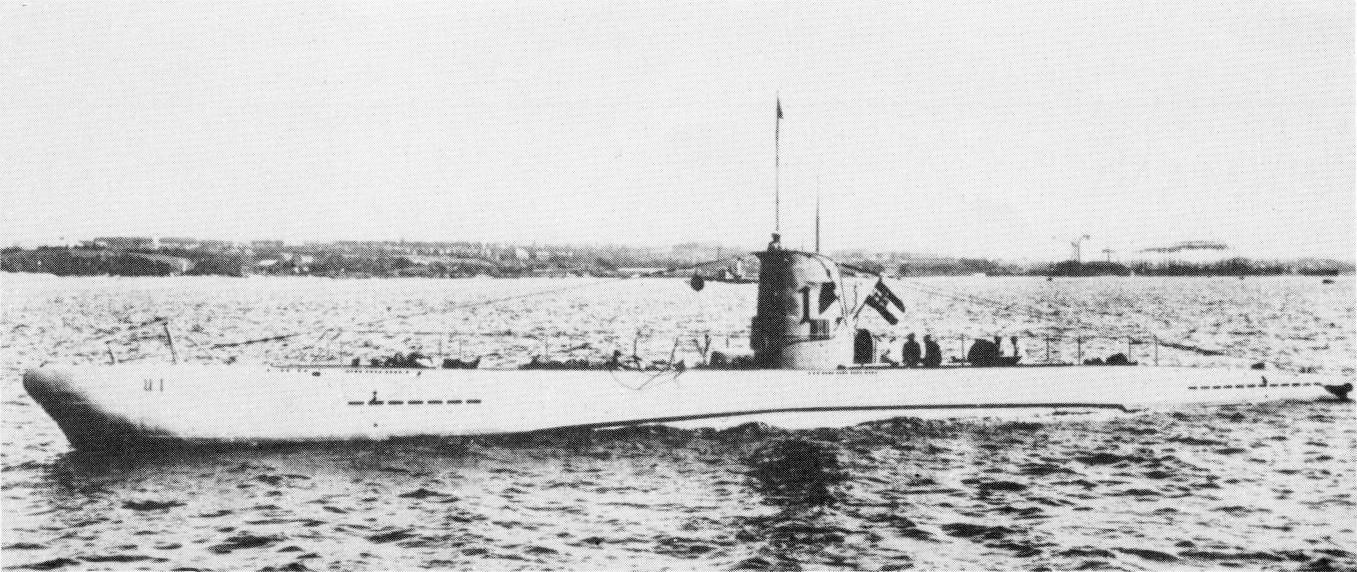
- U-1, a Type IIA submarine and lead ship of the class

Class overview
- Name: Type II Submarine
- Builders: IIA : Deutsche Werke (6); IIB : Deutsche Werke (4), Germaniawerft (14), Flender Werke (2), Galați shipyard (6 re-assembled); IIC : Deutsche Werke (8); IID : Deutsche Werke (16)
- Operators: Kriegsmarine; Soviet Navy (post war; U-9, U-18, U-24)
- Preceded by: CV 707-type submarine
- Succeeded by: Planned: Type XIII; Actual: Type XVII (HTP-powered); Type XXIII (conventional)
- Built: 1934–1940
- In commission: 1935–1945
- Completed: IIA : 6; IIB : 20; IIC : 8; IID : 16

General characteristics
- Type: Coastal submarine; Training vessel
- Displacement: IIA; 254 tonnes (250 long tons) surfaced; 303 t (298 long tons) submerged; 381 t (375 long tons) total; IIB; 279 t (275 long tons) surfaced; 328 t (323 long tons) submerged; 414 t (407 long tons) total; IIC; 291 t (286 long tons) surfaced; 341 t (336 long tons) submerged; 435 t (428 long tons) total; IID; 314 t (309 long tons) surfaced; 364 t (358 long tons) submerged; 460 t (453 long tons) total
- Length: IIA; 40.90 m (134 ft 2 in) o/a; 27.80 m (91 ft 2 in) pressure hull; IIB; 42.70 m (140 ft 1 in) o/a; 28.20 m (92 ft 6 in) pressure hull; IIC; 43.90 m (144.0 ft) o/a; 29.60 m (97 ft 1 in) pressure hull; IID; 43.97 m (144 ft 3 in) o/a; 29.80 m (97 ft 9 in) pressure hull
- Beam: IIA, IIB, IIC; 4.081 m (13 ft 4.7 in) o/a; 4 m (13 ft 1 in) pressure hull; IID; 4.916 m (16 ft 1.5 in) o/a; 4 m (13 ft 1 in) pressure hull
- Height: IIA, IIB; 8.60 m (28 ft 3 in); IIC; 8.382 m (27 ft 6.0 in); IID; 8.10 m (26 ft 7 in)
- Draught: IIA; 3.83 m (12 ft 7 in); IIB; 3.90 m (12 ft 10 in); IIC; 3.82 m (12 ft 6 in); IID; 3.93 m (12 ft 11 in)
- Propulsion: 2 × MWM RS 127 S 6-cylinder diesel engines, 700 PS (690 shp; 515 kW); 2 × SSW PG VV 322/36 double-acting electric motors, 360–375 PS (355–370 shp; 265–276 kW)
- Speed: IIA; 13 knots (24 km/h; 15 mph) surfaced; 6.9 knots (12.8 km/h; 7.9 mph) submerged; IIB; 13 knots (24 km/h; 15 mph) surfaced; 7 knots (13 km/h; 8.1 mph) submerged; IIC; 12 knots (22 km/h; 14 mph) surfaced; 7 knots (13 km/h; 8.1 mph) submerged; IID; 12.7 knots (23.5 km/h; 14.6 mph) surfaced; 7.4 knots (13.7 km/h; 8.5 mph) submerged
- Range: IIA; 1,600 nmi (3,000 km; 1,800 mi) at 8 knots (15 km/h; 9.2 mph) surfaced; 35 nmi (65 km; 40 mi) at 4 knots (7.4 km/h; 4.6 mph) submerged; IIB; 3,100 nmi (5,700 km; 3,600 mi) at 8 knots (15 km/h; 9.2 mph) surfaced; 35–43 nmi (65–80 km; 40–49 mi) at 4 knots (7.4 km/h; 4.6 mph) submerged; IIC; 3,800 nmi (7,000 km; 4,400 mi) at 8 knots (15 km/h; 9.2 mph) surfaced; 35–42 nmi (65–78 km; 40–48 mi) at 4 knots (7.4 km/h; 4.6 mph) submerged; IID; 5,650 nmi (10,460 km; 6,500 mi) at 8 knots (15 km/h; 9.2 mph) surfaced; 56 nmi (104 km; 64 mi) at 4 knots (7.4 km/h; 4.6 mph) submerged
- Test depth: 150 m (490 ft)
- Complement: 3 officers, 11 non-commissioned officers, 11 enlisted
- Sensors & processing systems: Gruppenhorchgerät
- Armament: 3 × 53.3 cm (21 in) torpedo tubes (bow); 5 torpedoes or 1 torpedo and 9 TMB mines; various 2 cm (0.79 in) C/30 anti-aircraft gun

The Type II U-boat was designed by Nazi Germany as a coastal U-boat, modeled after the CV-707 submarine, which was designed by the Dutch front company NV Ingenieurskantoor voor Scheepsbouw Den Haag (I.v.S) (set up by Germany after World War I in order to maintain and develop German submarine technology and to circumvent the limitations set by the Treaty of Versailles) and built in 1933 by the Finnish Crichton-Vulcan shipyard in Turku, Finland. It was too small to undertake sustained operations far away from the home support facilities. Its primary role was found to be in the training schools, preparing new German naval officers for command. It appeared in four sub-types.

== Background ==
Germany was stripped of its U-boats by the Treaty of Versailles at the end of World War I, but in the late 1920s and early 1930s began to rebuild its armed forces. The pace of rearmament accelerated under Adolf Hitler, and the first Type II U-boat was laid down on 11 February 1935. Knowing that the world would see this step towards rearmament, Hitler reached an agreement with Britain to build a navy up to 35% of the size of the Royal Navy in surface vessels, but equal to the British in number of submarines. This agreement was signed on 18 June 1935, and U-1 was commissioned 11 days later.

== Design ==
The defining characteristic of the Type II was the small size, its surfaced displacement being between half and one third that of the Type VII, and one third to one fourth of the Type IX's (depending on the variants used for comparison).

Known as the Einbaum ("dugout canoe"), it had some advantages over larger boats, chiefly its ability to work in shallow water, dive quickly, and increased stealth due to the low conning tower. However, it had a shallower maximum depth, short range, cramped living conditions, and carried fewer torpedoes.

The boat had a single hull, with no watertight compartments. There were three torpedo tubes, all forward, with space for two spare torpedoes inside the pressure hull. Although the boats technically had a deck gun, it was a 20mm weapon best used for defense against aircraft.

Space inside was limited. The two spare torpedoes extended from just behind the torpedo tubes to just in front of the control room, and most of the 24-man crew lived in this forward area around the torpedoes, sharing 12 bunks. Four bunks were also provided aft of the engines for the engine room crew. Cooking and sanitary facilities were basic, and in this environment long patrols were very arduous.

Most Type IIs only saw operational service during the early years of the war, thereafter remaining in training bases. Six were stripped down to their hulls, transported by river and truck to Linz (on the Danube), and reassembled for use in the Black Sea against the Soviet Union.

In contrast to other German submarine types, few Type IIs were lost. This reflects their use as training boats, although accidents accounted for several vessels.

These boats were a first step towards re-armament, intended to provide Germany with experience in submarine construction and operation and lay the foundation for larger boats to build upon. Only one of these submarines survive; the prototype CV-707, renamed Vesikko by the Finnish Navy which later bought it.

On 3 February 2008, The Telegraph reported that U-20 had been discovered by Selçuk Kolay (a Turkish marine engineer) in 80 feet (24 m) of water off the coast of the Turkish city of Zonguldak. According to the report, Kolay knows where U-23 and U-19 are, scuttled in deeper water near U-20.

== Comparison of Finnish Crichton-Vulcan CV-707(U2A) to German Type II ==
Comparison of CV-707(U2A) to Type II
Characteristic		CV-707	Type IIA U1-U6
Launched		11 May 1933	1939–1940
Displacement (tonnes)	Surfaced	254	254
Displacement (tonnes)	Submerged	303	303
Displacement (tonnes)	Total	381	381
Size (metres)	Length	40.90	40.90
Size (metres)	Beam	4.10	4.10
Size (metres)	Draft	4.20	3.80
Speed (knots)	Surfaced	13	13
Speed (knots)	Submerged	8	6.9
Range (nautical miles)	Surfaced	1,350 nmi (2,500 km; 1,550 mi) at 8 knots (15 km/h; 9.2 mph)	1,000 nmi (1,900 km; 1,200 mi) at 8 knots (15 km/h; 9.2 mph)
Range (nautical miles)	Submerged	40 nmi (74 km; 46 mi) at 4 knots (7.4 km/h; 4.6 mph)	35 nmi (65 km; 40 mi) at 4 knots (7.4 km/h; 4.6 mph)
Propulsion	Engine	Diesel-electric	Diesel-electric
Propulsion	Diesel	2 × MWM Diesel 700 PS (690 shp; 510 kW)	2 × MWM Diesel 700 PS (690 shp; 510 kW)
Propulsion	Electric	2 × SSW Electric 360 PS (360 shp; 260 kW)	2 × SSW Electric 402 PS (397 shp; 296 kW)

== Type IIA ==
The Type IIA was a single hull, all welded boat with internal ballast tanks. Compared to the other variants, it had a smaller bridge and could carry the German G7a, G7e torpedoes as well as TM-type torpedo mines. There were serrated net cutters in the bow. The net cutters were adopted from the First World War boats but were quickly discontinued during the Second World War.

Deutsche Werke AG of Kiel built six Type IIAs in 1934 and 1935.

=== List of Type IIA submarines ===
The prototype, built in Finland: Finnish submarine Vesikko

- U-1
- U-2
- U-3
- U-4
- U-5
- U-6

== Type IIB ==
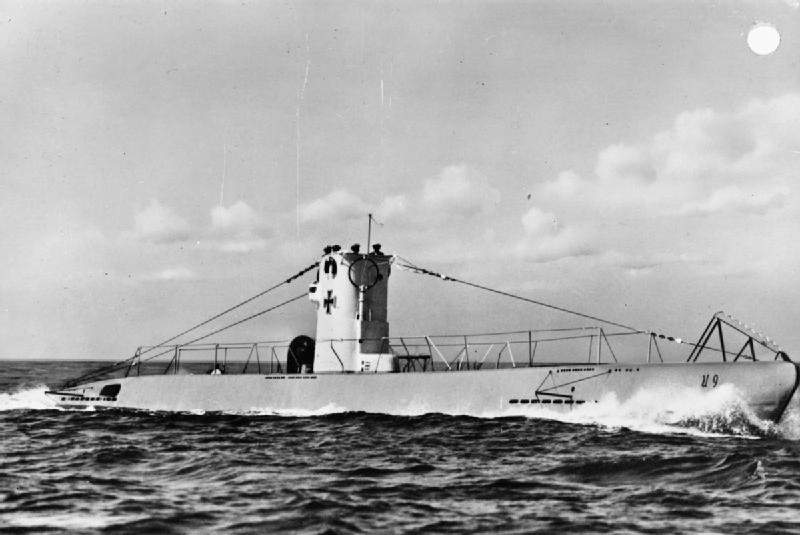
U-9, a typical Type IIB boat

The Type IIB was a lengthened version of the Type IIA. Three additional compartments were inserted amidships which were fitted with additional diesel tanks beneath the control room. The range was increased to 1,800 nautical miles at 12 knots. Diving time was also improved to 30 seconds.

Deutsche Werke AG of Kiel built four Type IIBs in 1935 and 1936; Germaniawerft of Kiel built fourteen in 1935 and 1936; and Flender Werke AG of Lübeck built two between 1938 and 1940. In total, twenty were built.

=== List of Type IIB submarines ===
There were 20 Type IIB submarines commissioned.

- U-7
- U-8
- U-9
- U-10
- U-11
- U-12
- U-13
- U-14
- U-15
- U-16
- U-17
- U-18
- U-19
- U-20
- U-21
- U-22
- U-23
- U-24
- U-120
- U-121

== Type IIC ==
The Type IIC was a further lengthened version of the Type IIB with an additional two compartments inserted amidships to accommodate improved radio room facilities. The additional diesel tanks beneath the control room were further enlarged, extending the range to 1,900 nautical miles at 12 knots. Deutsche Werke AG of Kiel built eight Type IICs between 1937 and 1940.

=== List of Type IIC submarines ===
There were eight Type IIC submarines commissioned.

- U-56
- U-57
- U-58
- U-59
- U-60
- U-61
- U-62
- U-63

== Type IID ==
The Type IID had additional saddle tanks fitted to the sides of the external hull. These saddle tanks were used to accommodate additional diesel storage tanks. The diesel oil would float atop the saddle tanks. As oil was consumed, water would gradually fill the tanks to compensate for the positive buoyancy. The range was nearly doubled to 3,450 nmi (6,390 km; 3,970 mi) at 12 knots (22 km/h; 14 mph) and enabled the Type II to conduct longer operations around the British Isles. A further development was the propellers were fitted with Kort nozzles, intended to improve propulsion efficiency. Deutsche Werke AG of Kiel built sixteen Type IIDs in 1939 and 1940.

=== List of Type IID submarines ===
There were 16 Type IID submarines commissioned.

- U-137
- U-138
- U-139
- U-140
- U-141
- U-142
- U-143
- U-144
- U-145
- U-146
- U-147
- U-148
- U-149
- U-150
- U-151
- U-152

== Boats in class ==
See list of German Type II submarines for details of individual U-boats.

== See also ==
- List of naval ship classes of Germany
- List of World War II ship classes

== Bibliography ==
- Gröner, Erich; Jung, Dieter; Maass, Martin (1991). German Warships 1815–1945, U-boats and Mine Warfare Vessels. Vol. II. Translated by Thomas, Keith; Magowan, Rachel. London: Conway Maritime Press. ISBN 0-85177-593-4.
- Williamson, Gordon (2005). Wolf Pack: The Story of the U-boat in World War II. Oxford: Osprey Publishing. ISBN 1-84176-872-3.
