= 22nd U-boat Flotilla =

22. Unterseebootsflottille
- Active: 1941–1945
- Country: Nazi Germany
- Branch: Kriegsmarine
- Type: U-boat flotilla
- Garrison/HQ: Gotenhafen, Wilhelmshaven

Commanders
- Notable commanders: Korvettenkapitän Wolfgang Lüth; Korvettenkapitän Heinrich Bleichrodt

22nd U-boat Flotilla ("22. Unterseebootsflottille") was formed in January 1941 in Gotenhafen under the command of Korvettenkapitän Wilhelm Ambrosius. The flotilla was disbanded in May 1945.

== Flotilla commanders ==
Duration	Commander
January 1941 – January 1944	Korvettenkapitän Wilhelm Ambrosius
January 1944 – July 1944	Korvettenkapitän Wolfgang Lüth
July 1944 – May 1945	Korvettenkapitän Heinrich Bleichrodt
