= Deutsche Werke =

German shipbuilding company

Deutsche Werke AG
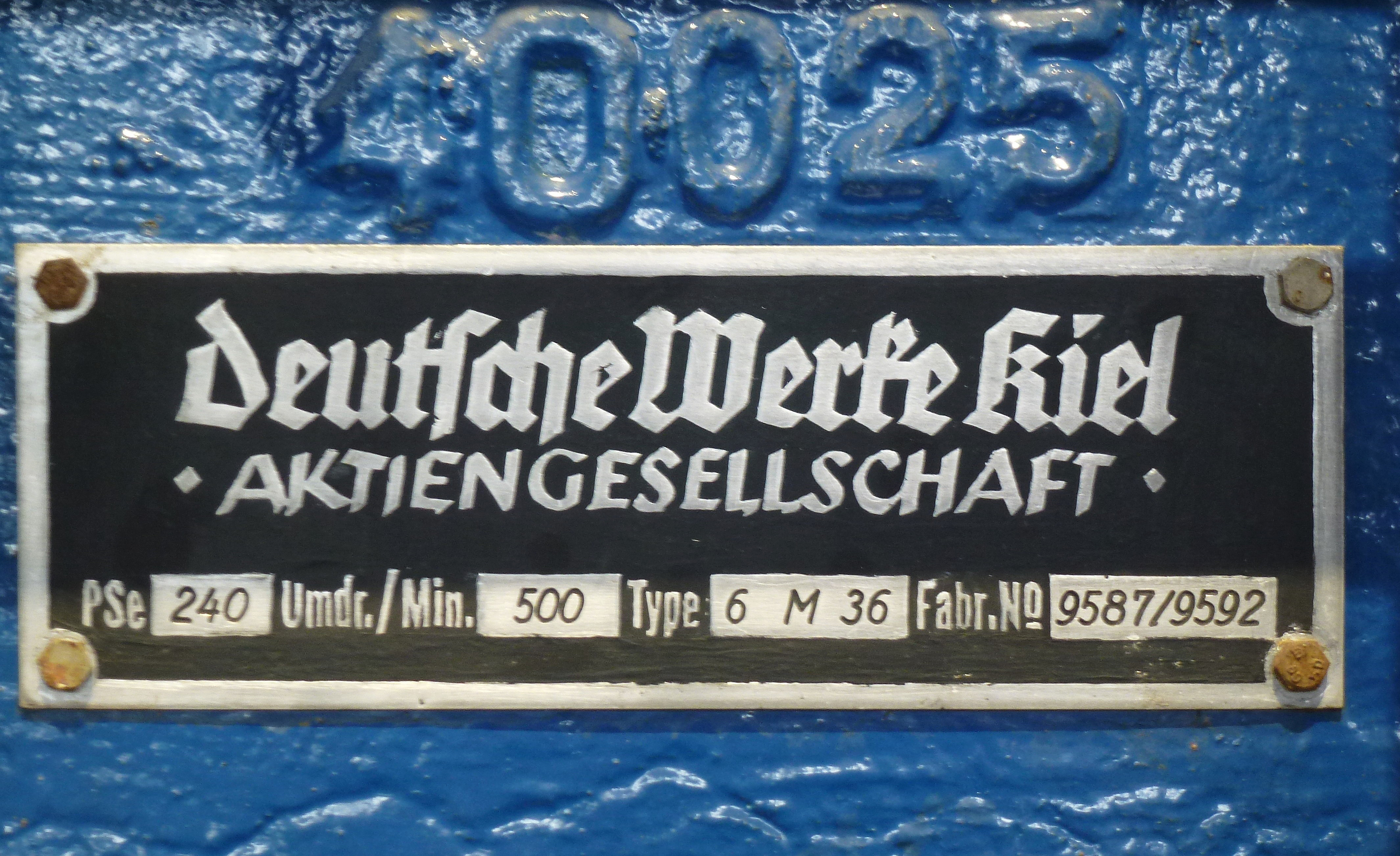
- Industry: Shipbuilding; Firearms
- Founded: 1925
- Defunct: 1945
- Fate: Dismantled after World War II
- Successor: Deutsche Industriewerke; Howaldtswerke Hamburg; Maschinenbau Kiel
- Headquarters: Berlin, Germany

Deutsche Werke Kiel AG was a German shipbuilding company that was founded in 1925 when Kaiserliche Werft Kiel and other shipyards were merged. It came as a result of the Treaty of Versailles after World War I that forced the German defense industry to shrink. The company was owned by the government of the Weimar Republic and its headquarters was in Berlin while the manufacturing location was in Kiel.

== History ==
Besides shipbuilding, Deutsche Werke also produced firearms. Especially well-known are the so-called Ortgies pistols, which were particularly popular in the United States. The pistols were developed by Heinrich Ortgies. Deutsche Werke started building merchant ships, but when the Nazi Party gained power in 1933 the production was changed to naval ships.

During World War II the company expanded to Gdynia in German-occupied Poland, establishing Deutsche Werke Gotenhafen. The Polish resistance conducted espionage of the Deutsche Werke in Gdynia.

Deutsche Werke facilities and infrastructure were destroyed during World War II by bombing raids. Parts of the works were reorganised as Maschinenbau Kiel.

In 1955 the shipyard areas were bought by Howaldtswerke.

== Ships built at Deutsche Werke Kiel (selection) ==
- Panzerschiff Deutschland (later renamed Lützow)
- Heavy cruiser Blücher
- Battleship Gneisenau
- Aircraft carrier Graf Zeppelin (not completed)
- Destroyer Z1 - Z4 (Type Zerstörer 1934)
- U-boats Type IIA, IIB, IIC, IID, Type VIIC, and Type XIV
