= List of ship commissionings in 1936 =

The list of ship commissionings in 1936 is a chronological list of ships commissioned in 1936.

	Operator	Ship	Flag	Class and type	Pennant	Other notes
4 January	Kriegsmarine	U-18		Type IIB coastal submarine	U-18	
6 January	Kriegsmarine	Admiral Graf Spee		Deutschland-class "armored ship"		Called a "pocket battleship" by the British
13 January	Royal Navy	HMS Apollo		Leander-class light cruiser	D63	Sold to Australia in 1938
16 January	Kriegsmarine	U-19		Type IIB coastal submarine	U-19	
18 January	Kriegsmarine	U-14		Type IIB coastal submarine	U-14	
25 January	United States Navy	USS Shark		Porpoise-class submarine	SS-174	
1 February	Kriegsmarine	U-20		Type IIB coastal submarine	U-20	
27 February	Kriegsmarine	F-2		F-class escort ship	F-2	
7 March	Kriegsmarine	U-15		Type IIB coastal submarine	U-15	
7 March	Kriegsmarine	F-3		F-class escort ship	F-3	
5 April	Kriegsmarine	F-4		F-class escort ship	F-4	
6 April	Kriegsmarine	U-25		Type IA	U-25	
1 May	Kriegsmarine	F-5		F-class escort ship	F-5	
6 May	Kriegsmarine	U-26		Type IA	U-26	
16 May	Kriegsmarine	U-16		Type IIB coastal submarine	U-16	
25 May	Kriegsmarine	F-6		F-class escort ship	F6	
9 June	United States Navy	USS Quincy		New Orleans class heavy cruiser	CA-39	
15 June	Royal Navy	HMS Amphion		Modified Leander-class light cruiser		Recommissioned into the Royal Australian Navy as HMAS Perth in 1939
25 June	Royal Netherlands Navy	HNLMS Jan van Brakel		Minelayer		
23 July	United States Navy	USS Tucker		Mahan-class destroyer	DD-374	
23 July	Soviet Navy	Shch 313		Shchuka-class submarine		
25 July	Kriegsmarine	U-33		Type VIIA submarine	U-33	
3 August	Kriegsmarine	U-21		Type IIB coastal submarine	U-21	
12 August	Kriegsmarine	U-27		Type VIIA submarine	U-27	
20 August	Kriegsmarine	U-22		Type IIB coastal submarine	U-22	
27 August	United States Navy	USS Porter		Porter-class destroyer	DD-356	
1 September	United States Navy	USS Drayton		Mahan-class destroyer	DD-366	
12 September	Kriegsmarine	U-28		Type VIIA submarine	U-28	
12 September	Kriegsmarine	U-34		Type VIIA submarine	U-34	
17 September	Kriegsmarine	Horst Wessel		Sail training ship		Recommissioned in the United States Coast Guard as USCGC Eagle in 1946
18 September	United States Navy	USS Mahan		Mahan-class destroyer	DD-364	
18 September	United States Navy	USS Shaw		Mahan-class destroyer	DD-373	
24 September	Kriegsmarine	U-23		Type IIB coastal submarine	U-23	
24 September	Kriegsmarine	U-35		Type VIIA submarine	U-35	
3 October	Royal Netherlands Navy	De Ruyter		De Ruyter-class cruiser		
8 October	Kriegsmarine	U-30		Type VIIA submarine	U-30	
10 October	Kriegsmarine	U-24		Type IIB coastal submarine	U-24	
23 October	Royal Navy	HMS Hero		Destroyer		Recommissioned into Royal Canadian Navy as HMCS Chaudiere in 1943
26 October	Royal Netherlands Navy	O 16		O 12-class submarine		
27 October	US Navy	Preston		Destroyer		
31 October	USSR Navy	ShCh-324		Submarine		
6 November	Italian Navy	Iride		Submarine		
16 November	Kriegsmarine	U-29		Type VIIA submarine	U-29	
17 November	USSR Navy	Shch-205		Submarine		
19 November	US Navy	USS Perch		Submarine		
16 December	Kriegsmarine	U-36		Type VIIA submarine	U-36	
28 December	Kriegsmarine	U-31		Type VIIA submarine	U-31	
31 December	French Navy	Dunkerque		Dunkerque-class battleship		
