= List of shipwrecks in January 1940 =

The list of shipwrecks in January 1940 includes ships sunk, foundered, grounded, or otherwise lost during January 1940.

== 1 January ==
List of shipwrecks: 1 January 1940
Ship	State	Description
Johann Schulte	Germany	The 5,334 GRT cargo ship was wrecked and sank off Buholmråsa, Norway. All 36 German sailors and two Norwegian pilots were rescued by Dronning Maud (Norway).
Lars Magnus Trozelli	Sweden	World War II: The 1,951 GRT cargo ship on a passage from Norrköping for Blyth in ballast, was torpedoed and sunk in the North Sea, about 50 nautical miles (93 km) northeast of Fraserburgh (58°14′N 1°38′W) by U-58 (Kriegsmarine) with the loss of seven of her 22 crew. Survivors were rescued by Ask (Norway).
Leo	Finland	Winter War: The cargo ship was bombed and sunk at Turku by Soviet aircraft. She was later raised and repaired.
Turkan	Turkey	The cargo ship foundered in a storm in the Black Sea with the loss of all twenty crew.
Young Harry	United Kingdom	World War II: The fishing vessel was sunk by a mine in the North Sea off Folkestone, Kent with the loss of all four hands.

== 3 January ==
List of shipwrecks: 3 January 1940
Ship	State	Description
Motorina	Greece	The 2,239 GRT tanker on a trip from Constanta for Iskenderun with a cargo of gasoline, ran aground about 2 nautical miles (3.7 km) north of Cape Aghios Nicolaos, Chios and was wrecked.
R-5	Kriegsmarine	The R-1-class minesweeper (46/60 t, 1932) was crushed by ice and sank off Stolpmünde.
S-2	Soviet Navy	Winter War: The S-class submarine struck a mine and sank in the Baltic Sea off Märket with the loss of all 50 crew.
Svartön	Sweden	World War II: Convoy HN 6: The 2,475 GRT cargo ship on a trip from Narvik for Middlesbrough with a cargo of iron ore, romped ahead of the convoy. She was torpedoed and sunk off Kinnaird Head (57°48′N 1°47′W) by U-58 (Kriegsmarine) with the loss of twenty of her 31 crew. Survivors were rescued by HMT Oak (Royal Navy).

== 4 January ==
List of shipwrecks: 4 January 1940
Ship	State	Description
Ardangorm	United Kingdom	The 5,200 GRT cargo ship on a passage from Cardiff for Fowey in ballast, ran aground on the Gwineas Rock, near Dodman Point, Cornwall (50°14′42″N 4°45′36″W), broke in two and was wrecked. All 36 crew were rescued by the lifeboat C.D.E.C. of Fowey ( Royal National Lifeboat Institution). The wreck was partly salvaged.
Maigue	Ireland	The 456 GRT coaster on a trip from Limerick for Liverpool with a cargo of bacon, struck a rock near Cape Clear Island, County Cork and was beached in a sinking condition. She was refloated on 21 May but was damaged beyond repair and was subsequently scrapped.
Rothesay Castle	United Kingdom	The 7,016 GRT cargo ship on a trip from New York for Clyde with general cargo and meat, ran aground at Sanaig Point, Islay, Argyllshire (55°53′13″N 6°21′44″W. She broke her back and was a total loss. Her crew were rescued by Englishman (United Kingdom).
Swarthy	United Kingdom	The tug sank at Portsmouth, Hampshire. Later salvaged, repaired and returned to service.

== 5 January ==
List of shipwrecks: 5 January 1940
Ship	State	Description
C. Arrivabene	Italy	The 5,061 GRT tanker on a passage from Augusta for South America in ballast, was driven ashore 2 nautical miles (3.7 km) south of Fedala, Morocco. She was consequently scrapped.
Fenris	Sweden	Winter War: The 484 GRT coaster on a trip from Örnsköldsvik for Holmsund with general cargo, was shelled and sunk in shallow water off the Sydost Brottens Lightship (Sweden) by ShCh-311 (Soviet Navy). The wreck drifted ashore north west of the lightship, her crew were rescued by icebreaker Atle(Sweden).
HMT Kingston Cornelian	Royal Navy	The 449 GRT naval trawler collided with Chella (France) in the Mediterranean Sea east of Gibraltar (36°2′N 5°23′W) and sank. Her depth charges exploded, killing all nineteen crew.

== 6 January ==
List of shipwrecks: 6 January 1940
Ship	State	Description
Barsac	Marine Nationale	The 1,049 GRT armed patrol ship ran aground on the Isalons Rocks, Vigo, Galicia, Spain and sank with the loss of eighteen crew.
Beltinge	United Kingdom	The 1,736 GRT cargo ship on a trip from Port Talbot for Les Sables d'Olonne with a cargo of coal, ran aground near Les Sables d'Olonne, Vendée, France and was wrecked. Her twenty crew survived.
British Liberty	United Kingdom	World War II: The tanker struck a mine and sank in the English Channel 4 nautical miles (7.4 km) north east of the Dyck Lightship ( Trinity House) with the loss of 24 crew.
City of Marseilles	United Kingdom	World War II: The cargo liner struck a mine and was damaged in the Firth of Tay. She was abandoned with the loss of one of her 164 crew. Survivors were rescued by the Broughty Ferry lifeboat Mona ( Royal National Lifeboat Institution), a Royal Air Force launch and a pilot cutter. She was later boarded by personnel from HMT Cranefly, HMT Sturton and HMT Suilven (all Royal Navy) and towed into Dundee, Scotland. Subsequently repaired and returned to service.
Eta	United Kingdom	World War II: The fishing trawler struck a mine and sank in the Thames Estuary 6 nautical miles (11 km) north west of the Outer Gabbard Lightship ( Trinity House). Her crew were rescued.
Frankenwald	Germany	The 5,062 GRT cargo ship on a trip from Narvik for Germany with a cargo of iron ore, ran aground near Brattholmen and subsequently sank. All 48 crew were rescued.
Gloreda	Australia	The launch caught fire and sank in Hervey Bay, Queensland. All four men aboard survived.
Notraco	Finland	The 991 GRT coaster on a trip from Helsingfors for Gothenburg with a cargo of wood pulp, ran aground and was wrecked outside Sandhamn.
Sampo	Merivoimat	The icebreaker ran aground off Pori. There were no casualties but the ship could only be raised in May 1940 and repairs were not completed March 1941.

== 7 January ==
List of shipwrecks: 7 January 1940
Ship	State	Description
Cedrington Court	United Kingdom	World War II: The cargo ship struck a mine and sank in the Goodwin Sands, Kent 2 nautical miles (3.7 km) north east of the North Goodwin Lightship ( Trinity House) (55°15′N 1°35′E). All 34 crew were rescued.
Dicido	Sweden	The 1,546 GRT cargo ship on a voyage from Northern Norway with a cargo of iron ore, ran aground at Tjoroneset, near Farsund and was wrecked. There were no casualties.
HMS Seahorse	Royal Navy	World War II: The S-class submarine was depth charged and sunk north west of Heligoland M-122 and M-132 (both Kriegsmarine). All 39 crew were lost.
Towneley	United Kingdom	World War II: The cargo ship struck a mine and sank in the North Sea north of Margate, Kent. Her crew were rescued by the Margate lifeboat.
HMS Undine	Royal Navy	World War II: The U-class submarine was depth charged and damaged south west of Heligoland by M-1201, M-1204, and M-1207 (all Kriegsmarine) and was subsequently scuttled. Her crew were rescued by the German ships.

== 8 January ==
List of shipwrecks: 8 January 1940
Ship	State	Description
Atlantic Scout	United Kingdom	The 4,575 GRT cargo ship on a trip from Algiers for Tees with a cargo of iron ore, ran aground 2 nautical miles (3.7 km) northeast of Cap Gris Nez, Pas-de-Calais, France. She was refloated the next day and beached at Boulogne, where she became a total loss. The wreck was dispersed by explosives in 1949.
Infante	Portugal	The 324 GRT wooden schooner on a voyage from Lisbon for Casablanca with a cargo of wood, collided with Congo (France) and sank off Cape St. Vincent, Portugal. Her crew were rescued by Congo.
Tynehome	United Kingdom	The 628 GRT coaster on a trip from Sunderland for Rotterdam with a cargo of coal, collided with Gitano (United Kingdom) and sank. Ten survivors were rescued by Gitano. Four crew were lost.

== 9 January ==
List of shipwrecks: 9 January 1940
Ship	State	Description
Dunbar Castle	United Kingdom	World War II: The ocean liner struck a mine off North Foreland, Kent (51°22′08″N 1°36′02″E) and sank with the loss of 9 lives. The wreck was dispersed by explosives in 1959.
Gowrie	United Kingdom	World War II: The coaster was bombed and sunk in the North Sea 4 nautical miles (7.4 km) east of Stonehaven, Aberdeenshire by aircraft of Fliegerkorps X, Luftwaffe. All twelve crew were rescued.
Manx	Norway	World War II: The 1,343 GRT cargo ship on a trip from West Hartlepool for Drammen with a cargo of coal, was torpedoed and sunk in the North Sea off Kinnaird Head (58°30′N 1°33′W) by U-19 (Kriegsmarine) with the loss of thirteen of her nineteen crew. Survivors were rescued by Iris and Leka (both Norway).
Montauban	France	The 4,191 GRT collier on a trip from Tyne for Marseille with a cargo of coal, ran aground on the Saltscar Rocks, Redcar, Yorkshire, United Kingdom (54°37′45″N 1°02′27″W). All 39 crew were rescued by the Redcar lifeboat. She broke up on 15 January.
Oakgrove	United Kingdom	World War II: The cargo ship was bombed and sunk off Cromer, Norfolk by aircraft of Fliegerkorps X, Luftwaffe with the loss of a crew member.
HMS Starfish	Royal Navy	World War II: The S-class submarine (730/927 t, 1933) was depth charged and damaged in the Heligoland Bight by M-7 (Kriegsmarine). She was forced on the surface and subsequently sank. Her crew were rescued and taken as prisoners of war.
Tonis Chandris	Greece	World War II: The cargo ship ran aground on Unst, Shetland Islands, United Kingdom (60°42′07″N 0°48′54″W) whilst evading a German submarine and was wrecked. Her crew were rescued by the Lerwick lifeboat.
Truida	Netherlands	World War II: The coaster struck a mine and sank in the North Sea west of Ramsgate, Kent, United Kingdom (51°27′N 1°50′E). All four crew were rescued by Friso (Netherlands).
Upminster	United Kingdom	World War II: The cargo ship was bombed and damaged off Cromer (53°03′N 1°29′E) by Luftwaffe aircraft with the loss of three crew. She sank the next day.

== 10 January ==
List of shipwrecks: 10 January 1940
Ship	State	Description
Axel	Germany	The 343 GRT coaster on a voyage from Gråsten for Kiel with a cargo of pigs, collided with Grille (Kriegsmarine) and sank in Kiel Bay. There were no casualties.
Bahia Blanca	Germany	World War II: The 8,558 GRT blockade-running cargo liner on a trip from Rio de Janeiro for Hamburg with a cargo of coffee and minerals, struck an iceberg in the Denmark Strait (66°09′N 26°20′E). She was subsequently shelled and sunk by HMS Newcastle (Royal Navy). All 62 crew were rescued by the trawler Hafstein ( Iceland).
Bucuresti	Romania	The 2,499 GRT cargo ship on a trip from Galatz for Palestine with a cargo of timber, ran aground on Samothrace Islands rocks, in the Aegean Sea (40°13′N 25°20′E and was badly damaged. Her crew were rescued. Bucuresti was subsequently towed to a Greek port. She was declared a constructive total loss and scrapped.
HMS Canton	Royal Navy	The armed merchant cruiser ran aground off Barra Head, Isle of Lewis, Outer Hebrides. She was refloated on 12 January, but was beached on 17 January at Holy Loch. Later repaired and returned to service.
Giulio B.	Italy	The 239 GRT wooden barquentine on a trip from Trapani for Viareggio with a cargo of salt, ran aground and was wrecked off Biscie Island, near Caprera in stormy weather. Out of 9 men crew, eight died.
Hertha	Norway	The cargo ship collided with a French vessel off the Welsh coast and was beached. She was later repaired and returned to service.

== 11 January ==
List of shipwrecks: 11 January 1940
Ship	State	Description
Croxton	United Kingdom	World War II: The 113.6-foot (34.6 m), 195-ton steam fishing trawler was bombed, strafed, and sunk in the North Sea (53°20′N 2°40′E) by aircraft of X Fliegerkorps, Luftwaffe. All nine crew were rescued after rowing 60 miles in 24 3/4 hours, they were rescued by Naval Drifter HMS Citron (Royal Navy) near the North Hammond Knoll Buoy.
Dietrich Hasseldieck	Germany	World War II: The fishing trawler struck a mine laid in 1939 by Vesihiisi (Finnish Navy) and sank in the Baltic Sea off Paldiski, Estonia. Two of her seven crew were killed.
El Oso	United Kingdom	World War II: Convoy HX 14: The 7,267 GRT tanker on a trip from Lobito for Ellesmere Port via Halifax with a cargo of oil, struck a mine and sank 6 nautical miles (11 km) west of the Mersey Lightship ( Trinity House) (53°32′N 3°25′W) with the loss of three of her 35 crew. Survivors were rescued by HMS Walker (Royal Navy).
Fredville	Norway	World War II: The 1,150 GRT cargo ship on a passage from Drammen for Methil in ballast, was torpedoed and sunk in the North Sea (58°25′N 1°10′W) by U-23 (Kriegsmarine) with the loss of ten of her fifteen crew. Survivors were rescued by the fishing trawler May (United Kingdom).
Keynes	United Kingdom	World War II: The cargo ship was bombed and sunk in the North Sea (53°47′N 0°46′E) by Luftwaffe aircraft. All seventeen crew were rescued.
Leonard Pearce	United Kingdom	Convoy HX 14: The 1,571 GRT cargo ship on a voyage from Barry for London with a cargo of coal, collided with Queen Adelaide (United Kingdom) and sank in the Bristol Channel off the Bull Point Lighthouse, Devon. All seventeen crew were rescued.
"Lucida"	United Kingdom	World War II: The 126.6-foot (38.6 m), 251-ton steam trawler struck a mine and sank in the North Sea with the loss of all 12 hands.
Manitowoc	United Kingdom	The cargo ship was severely damaged by fire at Newcastle upon Tyne, Northumberland. She was subsequently used as a stores hulk.
HMS Princess	Royal Navy	The armed yacht collided with Blairmore (United Kingdom) in the Bristol Channel and sank. Her crew were rescued by Blairmore.
Thorpebay	United Kingdom	The cargo ship was severely damaged by fire at Newcastle upon Tyne. Subsequently used as a hulk at Scapa Flow.
Traviata	Italy	World War II: The cargo ship struck a mine in the North Sea 8 nautical miles (15 km) south east of the Cromer Knoll Lightship ( Trinity House) and sank. All 29 people on board were rescued.

== 12 January ==
List of shipwrecks: 12 January 1940
Ship	State	Description
Danmark	Denmark	World War II: The tanker was torpedoed and cut in two by U-23 (Kriegsmarine) when lying at anchor in Inganess Bay, Kirkwall, Orkney Islands, United Kingdom (58°59′N 2°52′W). There were no casualties. The stern section sank on 21 January in Inganess Bay. The bow section was used as a storage hulk at Inverkeithing, Fife.
Granta	United Kingdom	World War II: The cargo ship struck a mine in the North Sea 11 nautical miles (20 km) off the Cromer Knoll Lightship ( Trinity House) (53°13′N 1°21′E) with the loss of twelve crew. Survivors were rescued by HMS Stork (Royal Navy) and the fishing vessels Fulham IV and Robur VIII (both United Kingdom).
Kastor	Estonia	The 944 GRT cargo ship on a trip from Gothenburg for London with a cargo of wood pulp, ran aground off Lysekil, Sweden and was wrecked.
HMT Valdora	Royal Navy	World War II: The naval trawler was bombed and sunk in the North Sea off Cromer, Norfolk by aircraft of X Fliegerkorps, Luftwaffe with the loss of all ten crew.
William Ivey	United Kingdom	World War II: The fishing vessel was bombed and sunk in the North Sea off St Abb's Head, Berwickshire. Her crew were rescued by another trawler.

== 13 January ==
List of shipwrecks: 13 January 1940
Ship	State	Description
Aura II	Merivoimat	Winter War: The escort vessel and former presidential yacht was sunk by one of her own depth charges as it exploded in its thrower while she was attacking Shch-324 (Soviet Navy) off Märket Island, Baltic Sea (60°23′N 19°10′E). She sank with the loss of 26 of her 41 crew.
Duchess of York	United Kingdom	The ocean liner ran aground off the west coast of Scotland and was severely damaged. She was refloated on 17 January, repaired and returned to service.
Sylvia	Sweden	World War II: The cargo ship was torpedoed and sunk in the North Sea north east of Aberdeen (58°45′N 1°12′W) by U-20 (Kriegsmarine) with the loss of all twenty crew.
Schiff 7 Wega	Kriegsmarine	The naval trawler ran aground on the Langhoft Tonne, in the Baltic Sea. She was later refloated.

== 14 January ==
List of shipwrecks: 14 January 1940
Ship	State	Description
Albert Janus	Germany	World War II: The cargo ship was intercepted by Victor Schoelcher (Marine Nationale) 75 nautical miles (139 km) west of Cape Finisterre, Spain and was scuttled by her crew.
Hullgate	United Kingdom	The 409 GRT coaster on a passage from Brugges for Antwerp in ballast, collided with Moyle (United Kingdom) in the Scheldt near Borsele and sank.
St. Lucia	United Kingdom	World War II: The fishing trawler struck a mine in the North Sea and sank with the loss of all twelve crew.

== 15 January ==
List of shipwrecks: 15 January 1940
Ship	State	Description
Arendskerk	Netherlands	World War II: The cargo ship was torpedoed and sunk in the Bay of Biscay 100 nautical miles (190 km) west of Ouessant, Finistère, France (46°55′N 6°34′W) by U-44 (Kriegsmarine) and sunk. All 65 people on board were rescued by Fedora (Italy).
Fagerheim	Norway	World War II: The cargo ship was torpedoed and sunk in the Bay of Biscay 80 nautical miles (150 km) south west of Ouessant (47°20′N 6°16′W) by U-44 (Kriegsmarine) with the loss of fourteen or fifteen of her crew. Five survivors were rescued by Iris (Greece).
Meuse	Belgium	The cargo ship departed from Newcastle-upon-Tyne, Northumberland, United Kingdom for Bruges, West Flanders, Belgium and then disappeared for an unknown reason. No further trace was found of her but the bodies of four of her twelve crew were found on the English coast. The rest of her crew were reported missing.
Newhaven	United Kingdom	World War II: The fishing vessel struck a mine and sank in the North Sea 18 nautical miles (33 km) south south east of Lowestoft, Suffolk. Nine crew were killed.
Seiho Maru No. 1	Japan	The fishing schooner ran aground on a reef off the south east tip of Guam. Her 24 crew were rescued by USS Penguin (United States Navy). She was later salvaged.

== 16 January ==
List of shipwrecks: 16 January 1940
Ship	State	Description
Chile	Denmark	The cargo ship ran aground in the Kattegat off Skagen. There were no casualties.
Gracia	United Kingdom	World War II: Convoy OB 287: The passenger ship struck a mine in the Irish Sea 5 nautical miles (9.3 km) south west of the Bar Lightship ( Trinity House) and was beached. Her crew were rescued. She was later refloated, repaired and returned to service.
Inverdargle	United Kingdom	World War II: Convoy HXF 15: The tanker struck a mine and sank off the south west coast of England (51°51′N 3°43′W). There were no survivors. Depending on sources, there were 44 to 49 dead.
Joséphine Charlotte	Belgium	World War II: The cargo ship struck a mine in The Downs, Kent, United Kingdom (51°32′N 1°33′E) and sank with the loss of four crew. Survivors were rescued by Mickleton (United Kingdom). The wreck was dispersed by explosives.
Panachrandos	Greece	World War II: The cargo ship was torpedoed and sunk in the Bay of Biscay west of Brest, Finistère, France (48°30′N 9°10′W) by U-44 (Kriegsmarine) with the loss of all 31 crew.
Pelinaion	Greece	The 4,291 GRT cargo ship on a trip from Takoradi for Baltimore with a cargo of iron ore, ran aground off St. David's Head, Bermuda and broke in two.
Premuda	Italy	The cargo ship (4,427 GRT) collided with the Goodwin Sands Lightship ( Trinity House) and was beached on the Goodwin Sands, Kent to avoid sinking. There were no casualties. She was later raised and repaired.

== 17 January ==
List of shipwrecks: 17 January 1940
Ship	State	Description
Asteria	Greece	World War II: The cargo ship struck a mine in the North Sea 9.5 nautical miles (17.6 km) north east of the Happisburgh Lighthouse, Norfolk, United Kingdom and sank with the loss of thirteen of the 25 people on board. A fourteenth crew member died two days later. The wreck was subsequently dispersed by explosives.
Aristides	United Kingdom	The 118 GRT motor ketch on a trip from Melbourne for Launceston with a cargo of 16 cattle and 90 sheep, ran aground on a southwest side of Three Hummock Island in rough weather and was wrecked. Both the crew and livestock were safely disembarked.
Brake Lightship	Trinity House	World War II: The lightship sank off Goodwin Sands, Kent after being rammed by Ernani (Italy). Her twelve crew were rescued by rescue boats from Margate and Ramsgate.
Cairnross	United Kingdom	World War II: Convoy HXF 16: The cargo ship struck a mine and sank in Liverpool Bay 7 to 8 nautical miles (13 to 15 km) off the Bar Lightship ( Trinity House) (53°32′N 3°27′W). All 48 crew were rescued by HMS Mackay (Royal Navy).
Enid	Norway	World War II: The cargo ship was torpedoed and damaged off Muckle Flugga, Shetland Islands, United Kingdom by U-25 (Kriegsmarine). Her sixteen crew were rescued by Kina (Denmark) and the fishing vessel Granada (United Kingdom). The wreck was scuttled by HMS Firedrake (Royal Navy).
Gratia	Germany	The cargo ship ran aground at Außenems and was wrecked.
Polzella	United Kingdom	World War II: The cargo ship was torpedoed and sunk in the North Sea approximately 6 nautical miles (11 km) north of Muckle Flugga, Shetland Islands by U-25 (Kriegsmarine) with the loss of all 37 crew.

== 18 January ==
List of shipwrecks: 18 January 1940
Ship	State	Description
August Thyssen	Germany	World War II: The cargo ship struck a mine in the Baltic Sea off Åland, Finland and sank. Her crew were rescued.
Canadian Reefer	Denmark	World War II: The 1,831 GRT refrigerated cargo ship on a trip from Haifa to Glasgow with a cargo of fruit, was intercepted 25 nautical miles (46 km) north east of Cape Villano, Spain by U-44 (Kriegsmarine). The crew were given 30 minutes to abandon ship before she was torpedoed and sunk. They were rescued by the fishing trawler Jose Ingacio de C. (Spain).
Flandria	Sweden	World War II: The cargo ship was torpedoed and sunk in the North Sea 100 nautical miles (190 km) off IJmuiden, North Holland, Netherlands (54°00′N 3°40′E) by U-9 (Kriegsmarine) with the loss of seventeen of her 21 crew. Survivors were rescued by Balzac (Norway) on 20 January.
Foxen	Sweden	World War II: The cargo ship was torpedoed and sunk in the North Sea (58°52′N 0°22′W) by U-55 (Kriegsmarine) with the loss of seventeen of her nineteen crew. One survivor was rescued by Leka (Norway).
Olga	Denmark	The 803 GRT coaster on a voyage from Skutskär for Barcelona with a cargo of wood pulp, ran aground and was wrecked at Halvorsholmen, off Arendal.
Pajala	Sweden	World War II: The transport was torpedoed and sunk east north east of North Rona, Hebrides, United Kingdom (59°05′N 05°56′W) by U-25 (Kriegsmarine). All 35 crew were rescued by HMS Northern Duke (Royal Navy).

== 19 January ==
List of shipwrecks: 19 January 1940
Ship	State	Description
Bonnington Court	United Kingdom	World War II: The cargo ship struck a mine and sank in the Thames Estuary almost 1 nautical mile (1.9 km) off the Sunk Lightship ( Trinity House) with the loss of two of her 37 crew.
HMS Grenville	Royal Navy	World War II: The G-class destroyer struck a mine in the Thames Estuary (51°39′N 2°17′E) and sank with the loss of 77 of her 175 crew.
Kaija	Finland	Winter War: The cargo ship was bombed and sunk at Koivisto, Finland by Soviet Air Force Petlyakov Pe-2 aircraft.
Kirkpool	United Kingdom	The cargo ship was driven ashore in the south west of England. Her crew were rescued. She was salvaged and repaired in 1941.
Mile End	United Kingdom	The cargo ship collided with HMT Faraday (Royal Navy) off the mouth of the River Tees, Co Durham (51°45′N 2°40′E) and sank with the loss of five of her sixteen crew. Survivors were rescued by HMS Stork (Royal Navy).
Patria	Sweden	World War II: The cargo ship was torpedoed and sunk in the North Sea (54°16′N 3°30′E) by U-9 (Kriegsmarine) with the loss of nineteen of her 23 crew. Survivors were rescued by Trygg (Sweden).
Quiberon	France	World War II: The cargo ship was torpedoed and sunk in the North Sea off Great Yarmouth, Norfolk, United Kingdom (52°34′N 2°05′E) by U-59 (Kriegsmarine) with all hands (six gunners and at least six crew).
Telnes	Norway	World War II: The cargo ship was torpedoed and sunk in the Atlantic Ocean north west of the Orkney Islands, United Kingdom by U-55 (Kriegsmarine) with the loss of all eighteen crew.
Unknown	United Kingdom	The small 10.87-ton sail fishing vessel sank off Blackpool while being delivered from the builder to the buyer. Both crewmen drowned. Salvaged and put in service as "Short Blue".

== 20 January ==
List of shipwrecks: 20 January 1940
Ship	State	Description
Caroni River	United Kingdom	World War II: The tanker struck a mine in the Falmouth Bay off Falmouth, Cornwall (50°06′N 5°01′W) while on trials and sank. All 47 crew were rescued by the Falmouth lifeboat and a Royal Navy cutter.
Ekatontarchos Dracoulis	Greece	World War II: The cargo ship was torpedoed and sunk in the Atlantic Ocean west of Portugal (40°20′N 10°07′W) by U-44 (Kriegsmarine) with the loss of six of her 28 crew. Survivors were rescued by Nino Padre (Italy).
Ila	Norway	The cargo ship came ashore on the coast of Kent, United Kingdom. The motor life-boat John and Mary Meiklam of Gladswood ( Royal National Lifeboat Institution) rescued her eighteen crew the next day. She was refloated and returned to service.
Miranda	Norway	World War II: The cargo ship was torpedoed and sunk in the North Sea 30 nautical miles (56 km) north west of Peterhead, Aberdeenshire, United Kingdom (58°14′N 2°05′W) by U-57 (Kriegsmarine) with the loss of fourteen of her seventeen crew. Survivors were rescued by HMS Discovery II (Royal Navy).
Nautic	Estonia	The cargo ship foundered off the Shetland Islands, United Kingdom (63°43′N 0°43′E). Her crew were rescued.

== 21 January ==
List of shipwrecks: 21 January 1940
Ship	State	Description
Andalusia	Sweden	World War II: The cargo ship last made a radio contact on this day. It is believed that she was torpedoed and sunk in the Atlantic Ocean off the west coast of Ireland by U-55 (Kriegsmarine) with the loss of all 21 crew. The date of sinking may have been 23 January.
HMS Exmouth	Royal Navy	World War II: The E-class destroyer was torpedoed and sunk in the Moray Firth, off Inverness (58°18′N 2°25′W) by U-22 (Kriegsmarine) with the loss of all 190 crew.
Ferryhill	United Kingdom	World War II: The collier struck a mine and sank in the North Sea off Blyth, Northumberland (55°05′N 1°27′W) with the loss of eleven of her thirteen crew. Survivors were rescued by HMT Young Jacob (Royal Navy).
Orazio	Italy	The passenger ship caught fire 40 nautical miles (74 km) south west of Toulon, Var, France due to an engine failure and explosion. One hundred and six of the 645 people on board were killed. She sank early the next day. Survivors were rescued by Cellina, Colombo, Conte Biancamano (all Italy); Kersaint, Ville d'Ajaccio (both French Navy); Djebel Dira, Djebel Nador, Gouvernor General Cambon, Gouvernor General Grevy and Six Fours (all France).
Protesilaus	United Kingdom	World War II: The cargo ship struck a mine in the Bristol Channel (51°31′N 4°04′W) and was beached off Swansea, Glamorgan where she was declared a total loss. All 75 people on board were rescued by HMT Paramount (Royal Navy) and the Mumbles Lifeboat. her bow was refloated 20 July and towed to Briton Ferry. Her stern was refloated on unknown date, and was under tow to Scapa Flow to be sunk as a blockship, but was scuttled due to leaks near Skerryvore on unknown date.
Rynanna	Ireland	The 1,299 GRT cargo ship on a trip from Antwerp for Limerick with general cargo, ran aground on the Goodwin Sands, Kent, United Kingdom (51°16′25″N 1°30′30″E) and was wrecked. Her thirteen crew were rescued the next day by the Walmer lifeboat Charles Dibdin ( Royal National Lifeboat Institution).
Tekla	Denmark	World War II: The 1,469 GRT cargo ship on a voyage from Burntisland for Aarhus with a cargo of coal and coke, was torpedoed in the North Sea south of the Orkney Islands, United Kingdom (58°18′N 2°25′W) by U-22 (Kriegsmarine) and sank with the loss of nine of her eighteen crew. Survivors were rescued by Iris (Norway) and HMS Sikh (Royal Navy).

== 22 January ==
List of shipwrecks: 22 January 1940
Ship	State	Description
Gothia	Sweden	World War II: The 1,640 GRT cargo ship on a voyage from Uddevalla for Genoa with a cargo of sulphates and paper pulp, was torpedoed and sunk off St. Kilda (57°46′N 9°50′W) by U-51 (Kriegsmarine) with the loss of twelve of her 23 crew.
Mulhausen	Germany	The fishing trawler sank due to icing in the Baltic Sea off Pillau. Some sources say she was sunk by a mine laid by the Polish submarine Żbik in September 1939 but witnesses reported no explosion. She was lost with all twelve hands.
Segovia	Norway	The cargo ship departed from an English port for Norway. No further trace, possibly torpedoed and sunk in the North Sea by U-55 (Kriegsmarine) or struck a mine and sank with the loss of all 23 crew.
Songa	Norway	World War II: The cargo ship was torpedoed and sunk in the Atlantic Ocean 220 nautical miles (410 km) west of the Isles of Scilly, United Kingdom by U-25 (Kriegsmarine). All 24 crew were rescued.
Sydfold	Norway	World War II: The cargo ship was torpedoed and sunk in the North Sea (58°40′N 0°30′W) by U-61 (Kriegsmarine) with the loss of five of her 24 crew. Survivors were rescued by Rona (Norway).
Valamon Luostari	Merivoimat	Winter War: The transport ship was sunk by Soviet Tupolev SB-2 bomber aircraft from the 41st squadron of the Ladoga Flotilla, at Vanha Niikkanenlahti. Most of the crew were ashore, and there was no loss of life.

== 23 January ==
List of shipwrecks: 23 January 1940
Ship	State	Description
Baltanglia	United Kingdom	World War II: The 1,523 GRT cargo ship on a trip from Hommelvik for Tyne via Methil with general cargo, was torpedoed and sunk in the North Sea off Lindisfarne, Northumberland (55°35′N 1°27′W) by U-19 (Kriegsmarine). All 27 crew were picked up by British fishing vessels.
Bisp	Norway	World War II: The 1,000 GRT cargo ship on a trip from Sunderland for Åndalsnes with a cargo of coal, was torpedoed and sunk in the North Sea east of the Orkney Islands, United Kingdom (59°05′N 1°13′E) by U-18 (Kriegsmarine) with the loss of all fourteen crew.
Onto	Finland	World War II: The 1,333 GRT cargo ship on a passage from Zeebrugge for Tyne in ballast, struck a mine laid by U-56 (Kriegsmarine) and sank in the North Sea 2.7 nautical miles (5.0 km) off Smith's Knoll Light Vessel (52°51′N 2°11′E). All twenty crew were rescued by HMS Auckland (Royal Navy) and a Greek steamship.
Pluto	Norway	World War II: The 1,598 GRT cargo ship on a passage from Bergen for Middlesbrough via Methil in ballast, was torpedoed and sunk in the North Sea (55°35′N 1°27′W) by U-19 (Kriegsmarine). All 22 crew were picked up by British fishing vessels.

== 24 January ==
List of shipwrecks: 24 January 1940
Ship	State	Description
Alsacien	France	World War II: Convoy KS 56: The 3,819 GRT cargo ship on a trip from Sfax for Brest with a cargo of phosphates, was torpedoed and sunk in the Atlantic Ocean south east of Cabo Espichel, Portugal (39°01′N 9°54′W) by U-44 (Kriegsmarine) with the loss of four crew.
Gleaner	United Kingdom	The coaster foundered in Liverpool Bay off Southport, Lancashire with the loss of one of her three crew.
Ljubljana	Royal Yugoslav Navy	The destroyer ran onto a reef and sank off Šibenik, with the loss of a crew member. She was later raised, and towed to Šibenik but was still under repair when she was captured by the Italians during their invasion of Yugoslavia in April 1941. The Italian navy finished the repairs in autumn 1942.
Notung	Finland	Winter War: The 1,278 GRT cargo ship on a trip from Turku for United Kingdom with a cargo of 1,220 tons of cellulose, was bombed and sunk in the Baltic Sea off Sottunga by 2 SB-2 bombers of 57th SBAP. Her crew survived.
Varild	Norway	World War II: The 1,085 GRT cargo ship on a passage from Drammen for Sunderland in ballast, was torpedoed and sunk in the North Sea north east of Kinnaird Head, Aberdeenshire, United Kingdom by U-23 (Kriegsmarine) with the loss of all fifteen crew.

== 25 January ==
List of shipwrecks: 25 January 1940
Ship	State	Description
Biarritz	Norway	World War II: The cargo ship was torpedoed and sunk in the North Sea 30 nautical miles (56 km) off IJmuiden, North Holland, Netherlands (52°39′N 4°15′E) by U-14 (Kriegsmarine) with the loss of 38 of the 57 people on board. Survivors were rescued by Borgholm (Norway).
Everene	Latvia	World War II: The cargo ship was torpedoed and sunk in the North Sea 5 nautical miles (9.3 km) off the Farne Islands, Northumberland, United Kingdom by U-19 (Kriegsmarine) with the loss of one of her 31 crew. Survivors were rescued by Dole (Latvia) and the fishing vessel Evesham (United Kingdom).
Gleneden	United Kingdom	The cargo ship struck a rock off Bardsey Island, Caernarvonshire and was damaged. She was beached off Puffin Island, Anglesey and declared a constructive total loss. Her 60 crew were rescued.
Gudveig	Norway	World War II: The cargo ship was torpedoed and sunk in the North Sea off the Farne Islands by U-19 (Kriegsmarine) with the loss of ten of her eighteen crew. Survivors were rescued by Dole (Latvia), the fishing vessel Evesham (United Kingdom) and Vim (Norway).
Orizaba	Germany	The cargo ship was driven ashore at Skjervøya, Norway. She was a total loss.
Tourny	France	World War II: Convoy KS 56: The cargo ship straggled behind the convoy. She was torpedoed and sunk in the Atlantic Ocean off the coast of Spain (38°00′N 9°55′W) by U-44 (Kriegsmarine) with the loss of eight of her crew. Survivors were rescued by Castillo Monforte (Spain).

== 26 January ==
List of shipwrecks: 26 January 1940
Ship	State	Description
HMS Durham Castle	Royal Navy	World War II: The accommodation ship struck a mine and sank in the North Sea 11 nautical miles (20 km) off the coast of Cromarty whilst under tow to Scapa Flow, Orkney Islands (at 57°41′N 3°54′W). There were no casualties.
Fu Yuang	Norway	The cargo ship developed a leak in her boiler room and sank in the Pacific Ocean off Hachijō-jima, Japan (33°40′N 139°56′E). All 44 crew were rescued.
Merisia	United Kingdom	The 129.9-foot (39.6 m), 291-ton steam trawler ran aground in a heavy snowstorm on the rocks in Bulgham Bay, north of Laxey, Isle of Man and was wrecked. All twelve crew were washed overboard and drowned.

== 27 January ==
List of shipwrecks: 27 January 1940
Ship	State	Description
Adamantios J. Pithis	Greece	The cargo ship was wrecked on Cam Rocks, near St Ann's Head, Pembrokeshire, United Kingdom. Her crew were rescued by a Royal Navy patrol vessel.
England	Denmark	World War II: The cargo ship was torpedoed and sunk in the North Sea north of Inverness-shire, United Kingdom by U-20 (Kriegsmarine) with the loss of twenty of her 21 crew.
Faro	Norway	World War II: The coaster was torpedoed and damaged in the North Sea 15 nautical miles (28 km) south east of Copinsay, Orkney Islands, United Kingdom (58°25′N 1°53′W) by U-20 (Kriegsmarine). The wreck drifted ashore the next day in Taracliff Bay, Copinsay. Eight of her fifteen crew were killed.
Fredensborg	Denmark	World War II: The cargo ship (2,094 GRT, 1922) was torpedoed and sunk in the North Sea (58°25′N 1°53′W) by U-20 (Kriegsmarine) with the loss of all twenty crew.
Halton	United Kingdom	The cargo ship foundered in the Bristol Channel off Lundy Island, Devon. The wreck was broken up at Briton Ferry, Glamorgan, from September 1940.
Hosanger	Norway	World War II: The cargo ship was torpedoed and sunk in the North Sea east of the Orkney Islands (58°25′N 1°53′W) by U-20 (Kriegsmarine) with the loss of seventeen of her eighteen crew. The survivor was rescued by HMS Northern Reward (Royal Navy).
President Quezon	Philippines	The 14,187 GRT cargo liner on a voyage from Vancouver for Manila with general cargo, struck a reef in the Pacific Ocean off Tanegashima, Ryukyu Islands, Japan (30°16′2″N 130°56′50″E) and sank with the loss of one life. Survivors were rescued by Ukishima Maru (Japan) and two other Japanese ships.
HMT Riant	Royal Navy	The 86.2-foot (26.3 m) minesweeping/patrol naval trawler sank due to water leakage in bad weather off, or stranding on, Gigha, Argyllshire. All fourteen crew were rescued.

== 28 January ==
List of shipwrecks: 28 January 1940
Ship	State	Description
Bauta	Norway	The cargo ship collided with Mälaren (Sweden) in Oslofjord and sank in shallow water. There were no casualties. She was raised in 1942, repaired and returned to service in September 1943.
Eleni Stathatos	Greece	World War II: The cargo ship was torpedoed and sunk in the Atlantic Ocean 90 miles (140 km) south west of the Fastnet Rock by U-34 (Kriegsmarine) with the loss of twelve of her 33 crew.
Eston	United Kingdom	World War II: Convoy FN 81: The cargo ship straggled behind the convoy. She struck a mine and sank in the North Sea off Blyth, Northumberland (55°03′N 1°24′W) with the loss of all eighteen crew.
Flora	Greece	World War II: The cargo ship was torpedoed and sunk in the Atlantic Ocean west of Figueira da Foz, Portugal by U-44 (Kriegsmarine) with the loss of all 25 crew.

== 29 January ==
List of shipwrecks: 29 January 1940
Ship	State	Description
Badjestan	United Kingdom	The cargo ship ran aground off Clachaig Point, Isle of Arran, Bute. Her crew were rescued by HMS Maori (Royal Navy).
East Dudgeon Lightship	Trinity House	World War II: The lightship was bombed and sunk by Heinkel He 111 aircraft of X Fliegerkorps, Luftwaffe with the loss of seven of her eight crew.
Eika	Norway	World War II: The cargo ship was torpedoed and sunk in St George's Channel (50°00′N 10°35′W) by U-51 (Kriegsmarine) with the loss of sixteen of her eighteen crew. Survivors were rescued by U-51.
Gripfast	United Kingdom	World War II: The cargo ship was bombed and damaged in the North Sea by Luftwaffe aircraft off the coast of Yorkshire. She was beached at the mouth of Bridlington Harbour with the loss of a crew member. She was later repaired and returned to service.
Highwave	United Kingdom	World War II: Convoy FS 83A: The cargo ship was bombed and sunk in the North Sea north of Margate, Kent by Heinkel He 111 aircraft of X Fliegerkorps, Luftwaffe. All eighteen crew were rescued by the fishing trawler Rian (Netherlands).
M-32	Soviet Navy	Winter War: The minesweeper was sunk by Finnish Air Force Fokker C.X aircraft at Saunasaari in the Lake Ladoga. The attack also damaged another minesweeper and killed two Soviet sailors.
Nora	Netherlands	World War II: The coaster was anchored off Deal, Kent when was struck by a drifting mine and was severely damaged. All six crew survived, several being wounded. Salvage tugs took her in tow and beached hear close to Deal pier, but the rising tide lifted her and the wreck crashed into the pier until it collapsed. Nora was a total loss and the remains of the pier were blown up later that year.
Skude	Norway	The coaster sprang a leak and sank in the North Sea off the Shipwash Lightship ( Trinity House). Her crew were rescued by Eminent (Belgium).
Stanburn	United Kingdom	World War II: The cargo ship was bombed and sunk in the North Sea 10 nautical miles (19 km) south east by east half east of Flamborough Head, Yorkshire by Heinkel He 111 aircraft of X Fliegerkorps, Luftwaffe with the loss of 25 of her 28 crew.

== 30 January ==
List of shipwrecks: 30 January 1940
Ship	State	Description
Bancrest	United Kingdom	World War II: The cargo ship was bombed and damaged in the North Sea east of the Orkney Islands (58°53′N 1°52′W) by Heinkel He 111 aircraft of X Fliegerkorps, Luftwaffe with the loss of one of her crew. She came ashore at Wick, Caithness. Survivors were rescued by HMS Javelin (Royal Navy).
Fingal I	Norway	The cargo ship (460 GRT, 1920) suffered an explosion in her hold or sprang a leak and sank off Barra, Outer Hebrides, United Kingdom. Her eleven crew were rescued.
Giralda	United Kingdom	World War II: The cargo ship was bombed and sunk in the North Sea east of Grim Ness, Orkney Islands by Heinkel He 111 aircraft of X Fliegerkorps, Luftwaffe with the loss of all 23 crew.
Keramiai	Greece	World War II: Convoy OA 80G: The cargo ship was torpedoed and sunk in the Atlantic Ocean off Lands End, Cornwall, United Kingdom (48°37′N 7°46′W) by U-55 (Kriegsmarine) with the loss of one life. There were 28 survivors, who were rescued by British Unity (United Kingdom) and HMS Fowey (Royal Navy).
Royal Crown	United Kingdom	World War II: The cargo ship was bombed and strafed by Luftwaffe aircraft 15 nautical miles (28 km) south of Smith Knoll Lightship, ( Trinity House). Four of her 37 crew were killed and all others left the damaged ship in two boats. One reached the coast but capsized, and seven of the 22 men aboard drowned. The other boat with eleven men disappeared without trace, bringing the total of dead and missing to 22. The burning ship ran ashore at Covehithe, Suffolk on 2 February. She was repaired and returned to service.
U-15	Kriegsmarine	The Type IIB submarine collided with Iltis (Kriegsmarine) in the North Sea, off the Netherlands (54°21′N 4°50′E) and sank with the loss of all 25 crew.
U-55	Kriegsmarine	World War II: The Type VIIB submarine was depth charged, shelled and sunk in the North Sea off the Shetland Islands, United Kingdom by the Guépard-class destroyer Valmy (both French Navy), Fowey and Whitshed (both Royal Navy) and a Short Sunderland aircraft of 228 Squadron, Royal Air Force with the loss of one of her 42 crew. Survivors were rescued by HMS Fowey.
Vaclite	United Kingdom	World War II: Convoy OA 80G: The cargo ship was torpedoed and sunk in the Atlantic Ocean south west of Cornwall (49°20′N 7°04′W) by U-55 (Kriegsmarine). All 35 crew were rescued by Pollenzo (Italy).
Voreda	United Kingdom	World War II: The cargo ship was bombed and damaged in the North Sea off Winterton-on-Sea, Norfolk (52°59′N 1°59′E) by Heinkel He 111 aircraft of X Fliegerkorps, Luftwaffe and was beached on the Winterton Shoal. Her crew were rescued by Vivien (Royal Navy). The wreck was sunk on 5 February.

== 31 January ==
List of shipwrecks: 31 January 1940
Ship	State	Description
Start	Norway	World War II: The cargo ship was torpedoed and sunk in the North Sea north of Buckie, Aberdeenshire, United Kingdom by U-13 (Kriegsmarine) with the loss of all sixteen crew.
Vidar	Denmark	World War II: The cargo ship was torpedoed and damaged in the North Sea east of the Orkney Islands, United Kingdom (58°39′N 2°00′E) by U-21 (Kriegsmarine) with the loss of fifteen crew. She sank the next day.

== Unknown date ==
List of shipwrecks: Unknown date 1940
Ship	State	Description
Arabia	Italy	The cargo ship ran aground in the Black Sea off Constanța, Romania.
Queen City	United States	The wharf boat sank at dock at the foot of Liberty Street, Pittsburgh, Pennsylvania sometime in January. The wreck was removed and burnt on 17 February.
