= German submarine U-58 (1938) =

German World War II submarine

History

Nazi Germany
- Name: U-58
- Ordered: 17 June 1937
- Builder: Deutsche Werke AG, Kiel
- Yard number: 257
- Laid down: 29 September 1937
- Launched: 12 October 1938
- Commissioned: 4 February 1939
- Fate: Scuttled at Kiel, 3 May 1945

General characteristics
- Class & type: Type IIC coastal submarine
- Type: Coastal submarine
- Displacement: 291 t (286 long tons) surfaced; 341 t (336 long tons) submerged
- Length: 43.90 m (144 ft 0 in) o/a; 29.60 m (97 ft 1 in) pressure hull
- Beam: 4.08 m (13 ft 5 in) (o/a); 4.00 m (13 ft 1 in) (pressure hull)
- Height: 8.40 m (27 ft 7 in)
- Draught: 3.82 m (12 ft 6 in)
- Installed power: 700 PS (510 kW; 690 bhp) (diesels); 410 PS (300 kW; 400 shp) (electric)
- Propulsion: 2 shafts; 2 × diesel engines; 2 × electric motors
- Speed: 12 knots (22 km/h; 14 mph) surfaced; 7 knots (13 km/h; 8.1 mph) submerged
- Range: 1,900 nmi (3,500 km; 2,200 mi) at 12 knots (22 km/h; 14 mph) surfaced; 35–42 nmi (65–78 km; 40–48 mi) at 4 knots (7.4 km/h; 4.6 mph) submerged
- Test depth: 80 m (260 ft)
- Complement: 3 officers, 22 men
- Armament: 3 × 53.3 cm (21 in) torpedo tubes; 5 × torpedoes or up to 12 TMA or 18 TMB mines; 1 × 2 cm (0.79 in) C/30 anti-aircraft gun

Service record
- Part of: 5th U-boat Flotilla; 4 February – 31 December 1939; 1st U-boat Flotilla; 1 January – 31 December 1940; 22nd U-boat Flotilla; 1 January 1941 – 30 June 1944; 19th U-boat Flotilla; 1 July 1944 – April 1945
- Identification codes: M 11 081
- Commanders: Oblt.z.S. / Kptlt. Herbert Kuppisch; 4 February 1939 – 30 June 1940; Oblt.z.S. Heinrich Schonder; 1 July – 24 November 1940; Kptlt. Hans-Joachim Rahmlow; 25 November 1940 – 6 April 1941; Oblt.z.S. Horst Hamm; 7 April – 3 September 1941; Lt.z.S.d.R / Oblt.z.S.d.R Bruno Barber; October 1941 – 31 August 1942; Oblt.z.S. Dietrich Schöneboom; 18 August – 14 December 1942; Lt.z.S. / Oblt.z.S. Horst Willner; 15 December 1942 – February 1944; Oblt.z.S.d.R Robert Rix; February – 30 June 1944; Lt.z.S.d.R / Oblt.z.S.d.R Richard Schulz; July 1944 – April 1945
- Operations: 12 patrols: 1st patrol: 25 August – 9 September 1939; 2nd patrol: 23 October – 10 November 1939; 3rd patrol: 29 November – 5 December 1939; 4th patrol: 27 December 1939 – 8 January 1940; 5th patrol: 20 – 25 January 1940; 6th patrol: 27 January – 8 February 1940; 7th patrol: 31 March – 3 May 1940; 8th patrol: 27 May – 17 June 1940; 9th patrol: 6 – 22 July 1940; 10th patrol: 29 July – 12 August 1940; 11th patrol: a. 2 – 20 September 1940; b. 2 – 12 October 1940; 12th patrol: 14 – 18 October 1940
- Victories: 6 merchant ships sunk (16,148 GRT); 1 auxiliary warship sunk (8,401 GRT)

German submarine U-58 was a Type IIC U-boat of Nazi Germany's Kriegsmarine that served in the Second World War. She was produced by Deutsche Werke AG, Kiel. Ordered on 17 June 1937, she was laid down on 29 September as yard number 257. She was launched on 12 October 1938 and commissioned on 4 February 1939 under the command of Oberleutnant zur See Herbert Kuppisch.

== Design ==
German Type IIC submarines were enlarged versions of the original Type IIs. U-58 had a displacement of 291 tonnes (286 long tons) when at the surface and 341 tonnes (336 long tons) while submerged. Officially, the standard tonnage was 250 long tons (254 t), however. The U-boat had a total length of 43.90 m (144 ft 0 in), a pressure hull length of 29.60 m (97 ft 1 in), a beam of 4.08 m (13 ft 5 in), a height of 8.40 m (27 ft 7 in), and a draught of 3.82 m (12 ft 6 in). The submarine was powered by two MWM RS 127 S four-stroke, six-cylinder diesel engines of 700 metric horsepower (510 kW; 690 shp) for cruising, two Siemens-Schuckert PG VV 322/36 double-acting electric motors producing a total of 410 metric horsepower (300 kW; 400 shp) for use while submerged. She had two shafts and two 0.85 m (3 ft) propellers. The boat was capable of operating at depths of up to 80–150 metres (260–490 ft).

The submarine had a maximum surface speed of 12 knots (22 km/h; 14 mph) and a maximum submerged speed of 7 knots (13 km/h; 8.1 mph). When submerged, the boat could operate for 35–42 nautical miles (65–78 km; 40–48 mi) at 4 knots (7.4 km/h; 4.6 mph); when surfaced, she could travel 3,800 nautical miles (7,000 km; 4,400 mi) at 8 knots (15 km/h; 9.2 mph). U-58 was fitted with three 53.3 cm (21 in) torpedo tubes at the bow, five torpedoes or up to twelve Type A torpedo mines, and a 2 cm (0.79 in) anti-aircraft gun. The boat had a complement of 25.

== Service history ==
U-58 was initially assigned to the 5th U-boat Flotilla during her training period, until 31 December 1939, when she was reassigned to the 1st U-boat Flotilla for a front-line combat role. U-58 carried out twelve war patrols, sinking seven ships for a total 24,549 gross register tons (GRT).

U-58, along with U-57, were both used for testing a new flooding valve schnorchel head during August 1943, that Deutsche Werke had constructed in June. For the test the schnorchel replaced the aft periscope. The initial trial was successful and a collapsible schnorchel forward of the bridge was envisaged for Type VIIC boats.

=== First, second and third patrols ===
U-58's first three patrols, completed during her workup and training period, were uneventful cruises in the North Sea. No ships were attacked during this period.

=== Fourth patrol ===
The submarine's luck changed for the better on New Year's Day 1940. The (neutral) Swedish steam merchant ship Lars Magnus Trozelli (1,951 GRT) was hit with a single torpedo and sunk at 58°14′N 01°36′W. Two days later the 2,475 GRT Svartön, also Swedish flagged, was sunk at 57°48′N 01°47′W while traveling with convoy HN-6.

=== Fifth and sixth patrols ===
U-58's fifth patrol was really only a six-day transit from Kiel to Wilhelmshaven. Her sixth patrol began from the latter port on 27 January 1940. On 3 February, at 09.36 hours, the only success of this patrol occurred when the small 815 GRT Estonian merchantman Reet was sunk with a single torpedo. Two previous shots earlier in the day had missed their mark (02.15 and 04.52 hours respectively). There were no survivors.

=== Seventh patrol ===
The U-boat's seventh patrol was an unsuccessful 34-day foray in the waters between Scotland and Norway. The boat returned to Kiel on 3 May 1940.

=== Eighth patrol ===
An eighth patrol into the North Sea was U-58's most successful in terms of tonnage destroyed, however all 8,401 GRT credited for this patrol comprised a single ship, the British Boom Defense Vessel HMS Astronomer, which was sunk at 58°01′N 02°12′W by three torpedo hits (two of which were coups de grâce). 101 of the 105 souls aboard survived to be picked up by other Royal Navy vessels.

=== Ninth patrol ===
The veteran submarine's ninth patrol saw her headed for a new home port in Lorient, France. Command was assumed by Oblt.z.S. Heinrich Schonder, who remained in charge of the boat for the rest of her career. Along the way, the 1,591 GRT Norwegian steam merchant Gyda was sunk by a single torpedo. This was a rather bold attack, given that the ship was being escorted by a Sunderland flying boat, a well known U-boat killer. The merchant vessel sank in less than a minute at 55°50′N 09°00′W.

=== Tenth patrol ===
Departing Lorient on 29 July 1940, U-58 headed north toward Ireland, where she sank the 4,360 GRT Greek merchant ship Pindos (a straggler from convoy SL-40), on 4 August with two torpedoes. The ship capsized to port before sinking at 55°22′N 08°50′W; however, 29 of the 32 crew escaped in lifeboats. The patrol terminated at Lorient on 12 August 1940.

=== Eleventh patrol ===
The U-boat's eleventh patrol was uneventful and she was transferred to a new home port, Bergen in Norway. En route, she attacked and sank the 4,956 GRT British merchantman Confield, a straggler from convoy HX 76. Although not sunk by the torpedo hit, the abandoned derelict was later shelled and sunk by the British sloop Weston.

=== Twelfth patrol ===
U-58 departed Bergen on 14 October 1940 for her final patrol, a transit back to Kiel. There she was transferred to the 22nd U-boat flotilla for service as a training boat. She remained in this role under various commanders for the rest of the war. She was eventually scuttled at Kiel on 3 May 1945 to keep her out of the hands of the advancing Allies. The wreck was subsequently raised and broken up for scrap.

== Summary of raiding history ==
Date	Ship	Nationality	Tonnage (Note: Merchant ship tonnages are in gross register tons. Military vessels are listed by tons displacement.)	Fate and location
1 January 1940	Lars Magnus Trozelli	Sweden	1,951	Sunk at 58°14′N 01°36′W
3 January 1940	Svartön	Sweden	2,475	Sunk at 57°48′N 01°47′W
3 February 1940	Reet	Estonia	815	Sunk
1 June 1940	HMS Astronomer	Royal Navy	8,401	Sunk at 58°01′N 02°12′W
18 July 1940	Gyda	Norway	1,591	Sunk at 55°50′N 09°00′W
4 August 1940	Pindos	Greece	4,360	Sunk at 55°22′N 08°50′W
8 October 1940	Confield	United Kingdom	4,956	Sunk

== Bibliography ==
- Busch, Rainer; Röll, Hans-Joachim (1999). German U-boat commanders of World War II : a biographical dictionary. Translated by Brooks, Geoffrey. London, Annapolis, Md: Greenhill Books, Naval Institute Press. ISBN 1-55750-186-6.
- Busch, Rainer; Röll, Hans-Joachim (1999). Der U-Boot-Krieg, 1939-1945: Deutsche U-Boot-Verluste von September 1939 bis Mai 1945 [German U-boat losses from September 1939 to May 1945] (in German). Vol. IV. Hamburg, Berlin, Bonn: Mittler. ISBN 3-8132-0514-2.
- Gröner, Eric; Jung, Dieter; Maass, Martin (1991). German Warships 1815-1945: U-boats and Mine Warfare Vessels. Vol. 2. Translated by Thomas, Keith; Magowan, Rachel. London: Conway Maritime. ISBN 0-85177-593-4.
