= German submarine U-19 (1935) =

German World War II submarine

Coordinates: 41°34′N 31°50′E

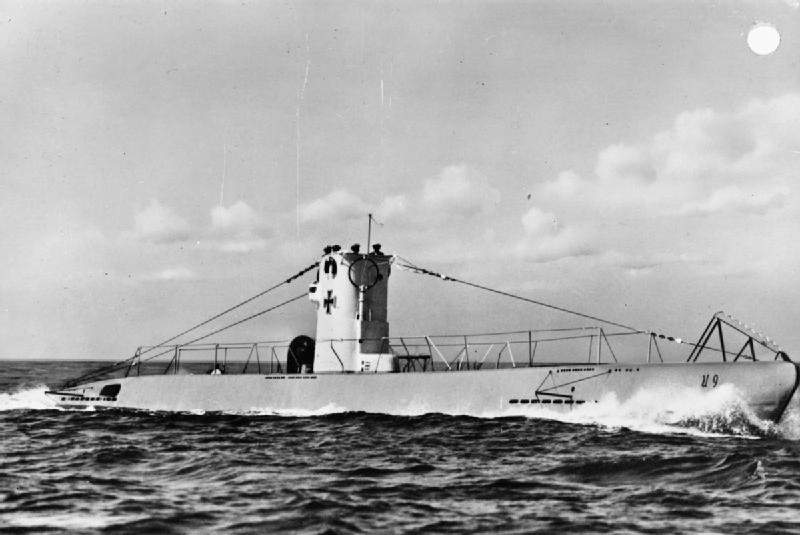
- U-9, a typical Type IIB boat

History

Nazi Germany
- Name: U-19
- Ordered: 2 February 1935
- Builder: Germaniawerft, Kiel; Galați shipyard, Romania
- Yard number: 549
- Laid down: 20 July 1935
- Launched: 21 December 1935
- Commissioned: 16 January 1936
- Fate: Scuttled on 11 September 1944 off the coast of Turkey in the Black Sea

General characteristics
- Class & type: Type IIB coastal submarine
- Displacement: 279 t (275 long tons) surfaced; 328 t (323 long tons) submerged
- Length: 42.70 m (140 ft 1 in) o/a; 27.80 m (91 ft 2 in) pressure hull
- Beam: 4.08 m (13 ft 5 in) (o/a); 4.00 m (13 ft 1 in) (pressure hull)
- Height: 8.60 m (28 ft 3 in)
- Draught: 3.90 m (12 ft 10 in)
- Installed power: 700 PS (510 kW; 690 bhp) (diesels); 410 PS (300 kW; 400 shp) (electric)
- Propulsion: 2 shafts; 2 × diesel engines; 2 × electric motors
- Speed: 13 knots (24 km/h; 15 mph) surfaced; 7 knots (13 km/h; 8.1 mph) submerged
- Range: 1,800 nmi (3,300 km; 2,100 mi) at 12 knots (22 km/h; 14 mph) surfaced; 35–43 nmi (65–80 km; 40–49 mi) at 4 knots (7.4 km/h; 4.6 mph) submerged
- Test depth: 80 m (260 ft)
- Complement: 3 officers, 22 men
- Armament: 3 × 53.3 cm (21 in) torpedo tubes; 5 × torpedoes or up to 12 TMA or 18 TMB mines; 1 × 2 cm (0.79 in) anti-aircraft gun

Service record
- Part of: 1st U-boat Flotilla; 1 January 1936 – 1 August 1939; 1 September 1939 – 30 April 1940; 1st U-boat Training Flotilla; 1 May – 30 June 1940; 24th U-boat Flotilla; 1 July – 18 December 1940; 22nd U-boat Flotilla; 19 December 1940 – 18 April 1942; 30th U-boat Flotilla; 28 December 1942 – 11 September 1944
- Identification codes: M 23 036
- Commanders: Kptlt. Viktor Schütze; 16 January 1936 – 30 September 1937; Kptlt. Hans Meckel; 30 September 1937 – 1 November 1939; Kptlt. Wilhelm Müller-Arnecke; 2 November 1939 – 2 January 1940; Kptlt. Joachim Schepke; 3 January – 30 April 1940; Kptlt. Wilfried Prellberg; 1 May – 19 June 1940; Kptlt. Peter Lohmeyer; 20 June – 20 October 1940; Oblt.z.S. / Kptlt. Wolfgang Kaufmann; 21 October – 8 November 1940; Kptlt. Rudolf Schendel; 8 November 1940 – 31 May 1941; Oblt.z.S. Gerhard Litterscheid; 1 June 1941 – February 1942; Oblt.z.S. / Kptlt. Hans-Ludwig Gaude; 16 December 1941 – February 1942; February – 18 April 1942; 28 December 1942 – 2 December 1943; Oblt.z.S. Willy Ohlenburg; 3 December 1943 – 6 September 1944; Oblt.z.S. Hubert Verpoorten; 7 – 11 September 1944
- Operations: 20 patrols: 1st patrol: 25 August – 15 September 1939; 2nd patrol: a.27 September – 1 October 1939; b.4 – 5 October 1939; 3rd patrol: a. 14 – 18 October 1939; b. 19 – 20 October 1939; c. 6 – 7 November 1939; 4th patrol: 14 – 20 November 1939; 5th patrol: 4 – 12 January 1940; 6th patrol: 18 – 28 January 1940; 7th patrol: 12 – 26 February 1940; 8th patrol: 14 – 23 March 1940; 9th patrol: 3 – 23 April 1940; 10th patrol: 21 January – 19 February 1943; 11th patrol: 17 – 30 March 1943; 12th patrol: 14 April – 4 May 1943; 13th patrol: a. 10 – 11 June 1943; b. 16 June – 7 July 1943; c. 8 – 10 July 1943; 14th patrol: a. 25 July – 16 August 1943; b. 18 – 24 August 1943; 15th patrol: 11 November – 2 December 1943; 16th patrol: 22 December 1943 – 19 January 1944; 17th patrol: 10 February – 7 March 1944; 18th patrol: 10 April – 6 May 1944; 19th patrol: 6 – 8 June 1944; 20th patrol: a. 25 August – 7 September 1944; b. 7 – 10 September 1944
- Victories: 14 merchant ships sunk (35,430 GRT); 1 warship sunk (441 tons)

German submarine U-19 was a Type IIB U-boat of Nazi Germany's Kriegsmarine during World War II. Her keel was laid down on 20 July 1935, at the Germaniawerft of Kiel. She was launched on 21 December 1935, and commissioned on 16 January 1936, under the command of Kapitänleutnant Viktor Schütze.

U-19 conducted 20 patrols, sinking 15 ships totalling 35,430 gross register tons (GRT) and 441 tons. On 1 May 1940, U-19 was withdrawn from combat duty and used for training and as a school boat. She returned to active duty in the 30th U-boat Flotilla on 1 May 1942, after having been transported overland and along the Danube to the Black Sea.

== Design ==
German Type IIB submarines were enlarged versions of the original Type IIs. U-19 had a displacement of 279 tonnes (275 long tons) when at the surface and 328 tonnes (323 long tons) while submerged. Officially, the standard tonnage was 250 long tons (254 t), however. The U-boat had a total length of 42.70 m (140 ft 1 in), a pressure hull length of 28.20 m (92 ft 6 in), a beam of 4.08 m (13 ft 5 in), a height of 8.60 m (28 ft 3 in), and a draught of 3.90 m (12 ft 10 in). The submarine was powered by two MWM RS 127 S four-stroke, six-cylinder diesel engines of 700 metric horsepower (510 kW; 690 shp) for cruising, two Siemens-Schuckert PG VV 322/36 double-acting electric motors producing a total of 460 metric horsepower (340 kW; 450 shp) for use while submerged. She had two shafts and two 0.85 m (3 ft) propellers. The boat was capable of operating at depths of up to 80–150 metres (260–490 ft).

The submarine had a maximum surface speed of 12 knots (22 km/h; 14 mph) and a maximum submerged speed of 7 knots (13 km/h; 8.1 mph). When submerged, the U-boat could operate for 35–42 nautical miles (65–78 km; 40–48 mi) at 4 knots (7.4 km/h; 4.6 mph); when surfaced, she could travel 3,800 nautical miles (7,000 km; 4,400 mi) at 8 knots (15 km/h; 9.2 mph). U-19 was fitted with three 53.3 cm (21 in) torpedo tubes at the bow, five torpedoes or up to twelve Type A torpedo mines, and a 2 cm (0.79 in) anti-aircraft gun. The boat had a complement of twenty-five.

== Operational history ==
=== First, second and third patrols ===
U-19's first three patrols involved voyages between Wilhelmshaven and Kiel via the North Sea. She also carried out a series of short journeys, one of which took her to the English east coast near The Wash.

=== Fourth and fifth patrols ===
The U-boat sank Carica Milica with a mine 3.5 nmi (6.5 km; 4.0 mi) off the Shipwash Lightship, (southeast of Aldeburgh) on 18 November 1939.

U-19 departed Wilhelmshaven on 4 January 1940. On the 9th, she sank Manx north of Kinnaird Head, near Fraserburgh in Scotland. She docked in Kiel on 12 January.

=== Sixth to ninth patrols ===
More success came when the submarine sank Battanglia on 23 January 1940 southeast of Farne Island and Gudveig 4.5 nmi (8.3 km; 5.2 mi) east of the Longstone Light vessel (north of Newcastle).

A steady stream of sinkings followed, including Charkow on 19 March 1940 and Bothal on the 20th.

U-19 was then transported in sections along the Danube to the Romanian port of Galați. She was then re-assembled by the Romanians at the Galați shipyard and sent to the Black Sea.

=== Tenth patrol ===
She departed the Romanian port of Constanța (where she was to be based for the rest of her career), on 21 January 1943. She was attacked by four unidentified aircraft off Gelendzhik on 13 February; damage was minimal.

=== 11th and 12th patrols ===
This foray was cut short on 27 March 1943 because of problems with the starboard engine.

A crewman fell sick between Tuapse and Poti. He was transferred to Schnellboot S-51 off Novorossiysk on 28 April 1943.

=== 13th patrol ===
This sortie was officially divided into three parts. Having left Constanța on 10 June 1943, she returned on the 11th due to a defective exhaust valve, having first re-fuelled at Feodosia.

Part two was the longest, starting from Constanța on 16 June and finishing in Feodosia on 7 July.

The third portion was little more than a movement exercise from Feodosia to Constanța which only lasted two days.

=== 14th patrol ===
Patrol number fourteen was also divided. The first segment was marred when a second sick crew member was transferred to German submarine U-20 (1936). U-19 put into Feodosia to re-supply.

The second part involved the U-boat as part of a patrol line, along with U-23 and U-24. This activity was cut short for U-19 because of problems with the periscope.

=== 15th-19th patrols ===
These sorties covered most of the Black Sea but were relatively uneventful.

=== 20th patrol ===
U-19 departed Constanța on 25 August 1944. She sank the Soviet minesweeper BTSC-410 Vzryv (No 25) on 2 September. The communist regime cited this incident as the reason that the Romanian fleet was seized. The commander was wounded in an accident on the seventh. The First Watch Officer (1WO) took over.

== Fate ==
The boat was scuttled in the Black Sea off the coast of Turkey on 10 September 1944. U-19 suffered no casualties to any of her crew.

On 3 February 2008, The Daily Telegraph newspaper reported that U-20 and U-23 had been discovered by Selçuk Kolay, a Turkish marine engineer. He thinks he is also close to pinpointing U-19, thought to lie more than 1,000 feet (300 m) down, three miles from the Turkish city of Zonguldak.

== Summary of raiding history ==
| Date | Name | Nationality | Tonnage (Note: Merchant ship tonnages are in gross register tons. Military vessels are listed by tons displacement.) | Fate |
|---|---|---|---|---|
| 21 October 1939 | Capitaine Edmond Laborie | France | 3,087 | Sunk (mine) |
| 21 October 1939 | Deodata | Norway | 3,295 | Sunk (mine) |
| 24 October 1939 | Konstantinos Hadjiperas | Greece | 5,962 | Sunk (mine) |
| 18 November 1939 | Carica Milica | Yugoslavia | 6,371 | Sunk (mine) |
| 9 January 1940 | Manx | Norway | 1,343 | Sunk |
| 23 January 1940 | Battanglia | United Kingdom | 1,523 | Sunk |
| 23 January 1940 | Pluto | Denmark | 1,598 | Sunk |
| 25 January 1940 | Everene | Latvia | 4,434 | Sunk |
| 25 January 1940 | Gudveig | Denmark | 1,300 | Sunk |
| 19 March 1940 | Charkow | Denmark | 1,026 | Sunk |
| 19 March 1940 | Minsk | Denmark | 1,229 | Sunk |
| 20 March 1940 | Bothal | Denmark | 2,109 | Sunk |
| 20 March 1940 | Viking | Denmark | 1,153 | Sunk |
| 27 June 1944 | Barzha | Soviet Union | 1,000 | Sunk |
| 2 September 1944 | BTSC-410 Vzryv (No 25) | Soviet Navy | 441 | Sunk |

== Notable people ==
- Otto Salman: From 16 January 1936 to 30 September 1937 Salman served as the 1st Watch Officer (1WO) aboard U-19 off the coast of Spain during the Spanish Civil War.

== Bibliography ==
- Busch, Rainer; Röll, Hans-Joachim (1999). German U-boat commanders of World War II : a biographical dictionary. Translated by Brooks, Geoffrey. London, Annapolis, Md: Greenhill Books, Naval Institute Press. ISBN 1-55750-186-6.
- Busch, Rainer; Röll, Hans-Joachim (1999). Deutsche U-Boot-Verluste von September 1939 bis Mai 1945 [German U-boat losses from September 1939 to May 1945]. Der U-Boot-Krieg (in German). Vol. IV. Hamburg, Berlin, Bonn: Mittler. ISBN 3-8132-0514-2.
- Gröner, Erich; Jung, Dieter; Maass, Martin (1991). U-boats and Mine Warfare Vessels. German Warships 1815–1945. Vol. 2. Translated by Thomas, Keith; Magowan, Rachel. London: Conway Maritime Press. ISBN 0-85177-593-4.
- Kemp, Paul (1999). U-Boats Destroyed - German Submarine Losses in the World Wars. London: Arms & Armour. ISBN 1-85409-515-3.
