= German submarine U-55 (1939) =

German World War II submarine

Coordinates: 48°37′N 7°48′W

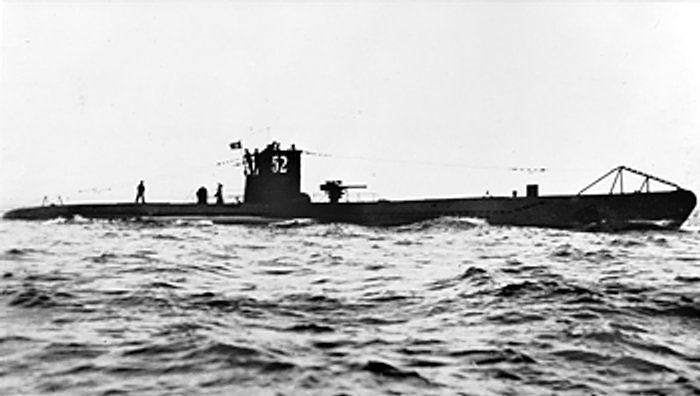
- U-52, a typical Type VIIB boat

History

Nazi Germany
- Name: U-55
- Ordered: 16 July 1937
- Builder: Germaniawerft, Kiel
- Cost: 4,439,000 Reichsmark
- Yard number: 590
- Laid down: 2 November 1938
- Launched: 19 October 1939
- Commissioned: 21 November 1939
- Fate: Sunk on 30 January 1940

General characteristics
- Class & type: Type VIIB U-boat
- Displacement: 753 t (741 long tons) surfaced; 857 t (843 long tons) submerged
- Length: 66.50 m (218 ft 2 in) o/a; 48.80 m (160 ft 1 in) pressure hull
- Beam: 6.20 m (20 ft 4 in) o/a; 4.70 m (15 ft 5 in) pressure hull
- Draught: 4.74 m (15 ft 7 in)
- Installed power: 2,800–3,200 PS (2,100–2,400 kW; 2,800–3,200 bhp) (diesels); 750 PS (550 kW; 740 shp) (electric)
- Propulsion: 2 shafts; 2 × diesel engines; 2 × electric motors
- Speed: 17.9 knots (33.2 km/h; 20.6 mph) surfaced; 8 knots (15 km/h; 9.2 mph) submerged
- Range: 8,700 nmi (16,112 km; 10,012 mi) at 10 knots (19 km/h; 12 mph)surfaced; 90 nmi (170 km; 100 mi) at 4 knots (7.4 km/h; 4.6 mph)
- Test depth: 230 m (750 ft); Calculated crush depth: 250–295 m (820–968 ft)
- Complement: 4 officers, 40–56 enlisted
- Sensors & processing systems: Gruppenhorchgerät
- Armament: 5 × 53.3 cm (21 in) torpedo tubes (four bow, one stern); 14 × torpedoes or 26 TMA mines; 1 × 8.8 cm (3.46 in) deck gun (220 rounds); 1 × 2 cm (0.79 in) anti-aircraft gun

Service record
- Part of: 7th U-boat Flotilla; 21 November 1939 – 30 January 1940
- Identification codes: M 38 070
- Commanders: Kptlt. Werner Heidel; 21 November 1939 – 30 January 1940
- Operations: 1 patrol: 16 – 30 January 1940
- Victories: 6 merchant ships sunk (15,853 GRT)

German submarine U-55 was a Type VIIB U-boat of Nazi Germany's Kriegsmarine during World War II. She was ordered on 16 July 1937 and laid down on 2 November 1938 at Friedrich Krupp Germaniawerft in Kiel as yard number 590. Launched on 19 October 1939, she went into service on 21 November 1939 under the command of Kapitänleutnant (Kptlt.) Werner Heidel.

== Design ==
German Type VIIB submarines were preceded by the shorter Type VIIA submarines. U-55 had a displacement of 753 tonnes (741 long tons) when at the surface and 857 tonnes (843 long tons) while submerged. She had a total length of 66.50 m (218 ft 2 in), a pressure hull length of 48.80 m (160 ft 1 in), a beam of 6.20 m (20 ft 4 in), a height of 9.50 m (31 ft 2 in), and a draught of 4.74 m (15 ft 7 in). The submarine was powered by two MAN M 6 V 40/46 four-stroke, six-cylinder supercharged diesel engines producing a total of 2,800 to 3,200 metric horsepower (2,060 to 2,350 kW; 2,760 to 3,160 shp) for use while surfaced, two AEG GU 460/8-276 double-acting electric motors producing a total of 750 metric horsepower (550 kW; 740 shp) for use while submerged. She had two shafts and two 1.23 m (4 ft) propellers. The boat was capable of operating at depths of up to 230 metres (750 ft).

The submarine had a maximum surface speed of 17.9 knots (33.2 km/h; 20.6 mph) and a maximum submerged speed of 8 knots (15 km/h; 9.2 mph). When submerged, the boat could operate for 90 nautical miles (170 km; 100 mi) at 4 knots (7.4 km/h; 4.6 mph); when surfaced, she could travel 8,700 nautical miles (16,100 km; 10,000 mi) at 10 knots (19 km/h; 12 mph). U-55 was fitted with five 53.3 cm (21 in) torpedo tubes (four fitted at the bow and one at the stern), fourteen torpedoes, one 8.8 cm (3.46 in) SK C/35 naval gun, 220 rounds, and one 2 cm (0.79 in) anti-aircraft gun The boat had a complement of between forty-four and sixty.

== Service history ==
U-55 began her first and only war patrol on 16 January 1940, under Heidel's command; he had previously sunk two ships in U-7. She sank four small freighters sailing independently, then attacked convoy OA-80G on 29 January. U-55 sank two more ships before coming under concerted attack from the convoy's escorts, supported by a Sunderland flying boat from RAF Coastal Command 228 Squadron.

=== Fate ===
After a sustained depth charge attack, the U-boat surfaced and carried out a running gun battle before her deck gun jammed. Heidel ordered the boat to be abandoned, then apparently went down with it. The remainder of the crew was rescued by the escorts. The British awarded official credit for sinking U-55 to the sloop HMS Fowey, the destroyer HMS Whitshed, French destroyers Valmy and Guépard, and the Sunderland.

== Summary of raiding history ==
Date	Ship	Nationality	Tonnage (GRT)	Fate
18 January 1940	Foxen	Sweden	1,304	Sunk
19 January 1940	Telnes	Norway	1,694	Sunk
22 January 1940	Segovia	Norway	1,387	Sunk
23 January 1940	Andalusia	Sweden	1,357	Sunk
30 January 1940	Keramiai	Greece	5,085	Sunk
30 January 1940	Vaclite	United Kingdom	5,026	Sunk

== Bibliography ==
- Blair, Clay (1996). Hitler's U-Boat War. Vol. 1: The Hunters 1939–1942. New York: Random House. ISBN 0-394-58839-8.
- Busch, Rainer; Röll, Hans-Joachim (1999). German U-boat commanders of World War II : a biographical dictionary. Translated by Brooks, Geoffrey. London, Annapolis, Md: Greenhill Books, Naval Institute Press. ISBN 1-55750-186-6.
- Busch, Rainer; Röll, Hans-Joachim (1999). Deutsche U-Boot-Verluste von September 1939 bis Mai 1945 [German U-boat losses from September 1939 to May 1945]. Der U-Boot-Krieg (in German). Vol. IV. Hamburg, Berlin, Bonn: Mittler. ISBN 3-8132-0514-2.
- Gröner, Erich; Jung, Dieter; Maass, Martin (1991). U-boats and Mine Warfare Vessels. German Warships 1815–1945. Vol. 2. Translated by Thomas, Keith; Magowan, Rachel. London: Conway Maritime Press. ISBN 0-85177-593-4.
- Kemp, Paul (1997). U-Boats Destroyed, German Submarine Losses in the World Wars. Arms and Armour. p. 63. ISBN 1-85409-515-3.
