= German submarine U-44 (1939) =

German World War II submarine

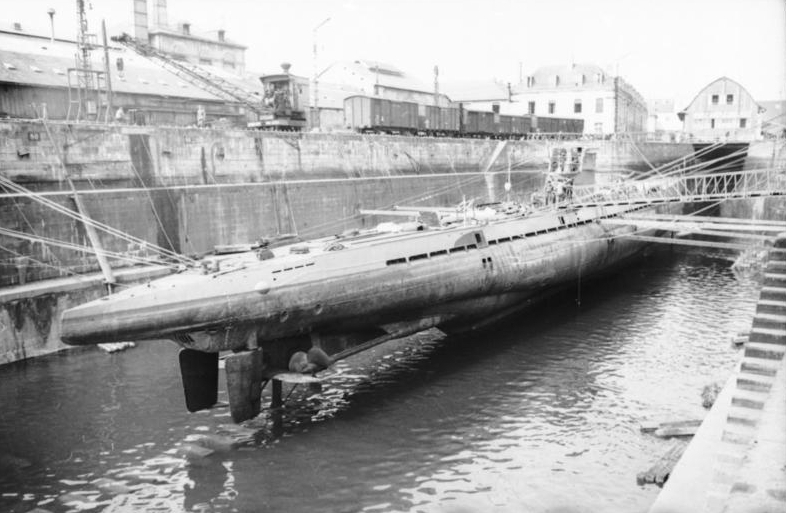
- U-37, (an identical U-boat to U-44) at Lorient in 1940

History

Nazi Germany
- Name: U-44
- Ordered: 21 November 1936
- Builder: AG Weser, Bremen
- Yard number: 949
- Laid down: 15 September 1938
- Launched: 5 August 1939
- Commissioned: 4 November 1939
- Fate: Sunk by a mine on 13 March 1940 off the coast of the Netherlands. All crew members were lost

General characteristics
- Class & type: Type IXA submarine
- Displacement: 1,032 t (1,016 long tons) surfaced; 1,153 t (1,135 long tons) submerged
- Length: 76.50 m (251 ft) o/a; 58.75 m (192 ft 9 in) pressure hull
- Beam: 6.51 m (21 ft 4 in) o/a; 4.40 m (14 ft 5 in) pressure hull
- Height: 9.40 m (30 ft 10 in)
- Draught: 4.70 m (15 ft 5 in)
- Installed power: 4,400 PS (3,200 kW; 4,300 bhp) (diesels); 1,000 PS (740 kW; 990 shp) (electric)
- Propulsion: 2 shafts; 2 × diesel engines; 2 × electric motors
- Speed: 18.2 knots (33.7 km/h; 20.9 mph) surfaced; 7.7 knots (14.3 km/h; 8.9 mph) submerged
- Range: 10,500 nmi (19,400 km; 12,100 mi) at 10 knots (19 km/h; 12 mph) surfaced; 65–78 nmi (120–144 km; 75–90 mi) at 4 knots (7.4 km/h; 4.6 mph) submerged
- Test depth: 230 m (750 ft)
- Complement: 4 officers, 44 enlisted
- Armament: 6 × torpedo tubes (4 bow, 2 stern); 22 × 53.3 cm (21 in) torpedoes; 1 × 10.5 cm (4.1 in) SK C/32 deck gun (180 rounds); 1 × 3.7 cm (1.5 in) SK C/30 AA gun; 1 × twin 2 cm FlaK 30 AA guns

Service record
- Part of: 6th U-boat Flotilla; 4 November – 31 December 1939; 2nd U-boat Flotilla; 1 January – 13 March 1940
- Identification codes: M 13 206
- Commanders: Kptlt. Ludwig Mathes; 4 November – 13 March 1940
- Operations: 2 patrols: 1st patrol: 6 January – 9 February 1940; 2nd patrol: 13 March 1940
- Victories: 8 merchant ships sunk (30,885 GRT)

German submarine U-44 was a Type IXA U-boat of Nazi Germany's Kriegsmarine that operated during World War II. She was ordered in November 1936 and laid down in September 1938 in Bremen. She was launched in August 1939 and commissioned in November.

During her service in the Kriegsmarine, U-44 conducted only two war patrols and sank a total of eight ships for a loss of 30,885 GRT. On 13 March 1940, she struck a mine that was located in field Number 7 off the north coast of the Netherlands. All 47 of her crew members went down with the submarine.

== Design ==
As one of the eight original German Type IX submarines, later designated IXA, U-44 had a displacement of 1,032 tonnes (1,016 long tons) when at the surface and 1,153 tonnes (1,135 long tons) while submerged. The U-boat had a total length of 76.50 m (251 ft), a pressure hull length of 58.75 m (192 ft 9 in), a beam of 6.51 m (21 ft 4 in), a height of 9.40 m (30 ft 10 in), and a draught of 4.70 m (15 ft 5 in). The submarine was powered by two MAN M 9 V 40/46 supercharged four-stroke, nine-cylinder diesel engines producing a total of 4,400 metric horsepower (3,240 kW; 4,340 shp) for use while surfaced, two Siemens-Schuckert 2 GU 345/34 double-acting electric motors producing a total of 1,000 metric horsepower (740 kW; 990 shp) for use while submerged. She had two shafts and two 1.92 m (6 ft) propellers. The boat was capable of operating at depths of up to 230 metres (750 ft).

The submarine had a maximum surface speed of 18.2 knots (33.7 km/h; 20.9 mph) and a maximum submerged speed of 7.7 knots (14.3 km/h; 8.9 mph). When submerged, the boat could operate for 65–78 nautical miles (120–144 km; 75–90 mi) at 4 knots (7.4 km/h; 4.6 mph); when surfaced, she could travel 10,500 nautical miles (19,400 km; 12,100 mi) at 10 knots (19 km/h; 12 mph). U-44 was fitted with six 53.3 cm (21 in) torpedo tubes (four fitted at the bow and two at the stern), 22 torpedoes, one 10.5 cm (4.13 in) SK C/32 naval gun, 180 rounds, and a 3.7 cm (1.5 in) SK C/30 as well as a 2 cm (0.79 in) C/30 anti-aircraft gun. The boat had a complement of forty-eight.

== Service history ==
U-44 was ordered by the Kriegsmarine on 21 November 1936 (as part of Plan Z and in violation of the Treaty of Versailles). She was laid down on 15 September 1938 by AG Weser, in Bremen as yard number 949. U-44 was launched on 5 August 1939 and commissioned on 4 November of that same year under the command of Kapitänleutnant Ludwig Mathes.

U-44 had a very short operational life. During her service with the Kriegsmarine, she took part in only two combat patrols. After training exercises with the 6th U-boat Flotilla from 4 November to 31 December 1939, U-44 was assigned as the front boat for the 2nd U-boat Flotilla on 1 January 1940. She was to remain a part of this flotilla until her loss.

=== First patrol ===
The first of U-44's two patrols began on 6 January 1940 when she left Wilhelmshaven for the North Sea, eventually circumnavigating the British Isles, travelling as far south as the Bay of Biscay and Portugal. It was in these two locations that U-44 sank her first (and last) merchant ships. Following these victories, she headed north again, travelling just north of the coast of Scotland and back into the North Sea. She then returned to Wilhelmshaven, arriving there on 9 February 1940. Over a period of thirty-five days, U-44 sank eight merchant ships, for a total loss of 30,885 GRT.

=== Second patrol ===
Unlike her first outing, U-44's second patrol was a disaster, not even lasting through the first day. After spending more than a month in Wilhelmshaven, she began her second patrol on 13 March 1940. A few hours after leaving port, U-44 entered minefield Number 7, just off of the northern coast of the Netherlands. This particular minefield was laid by the British destroyers HMS Esk, Express, Icarus, Faulknor and Impulsive. Upon entering the minefield, U-44 struck one of the devices and sank at 54°14′N 5°07′E. All forty-seven of her crew were lost.

== Previously recorded fate ==
Sunk by HMS Fortune on 20 March 1940.

== Summary of raiding history ==
During her service, U-44 sank eight commercial ships for a loss of 30,885 GRT. All of these ships were sunk during her first patrol.

| Date | Ship | Nationality | Tonnage | Fate |
|---|---|---|---|---|
| 15 January 1940 | Arendskerk | Netherlands | 7,906 | Sunk |
| 15 January 1940 | Fagerheim | Norway | 1,590 | Sunk |
| 16 January 1940 | Panachrandros | Greece | 4,661 | Sunk |
| 18 January 1940 | Canadian Reefer | Denmark | 1,831 | Sunk |
| 20 January 1940 | Ekatontarchos Dracoulis | Greece | 5,329 | Sunk |
| 24 January 1940 | Tourny | France | 3,819 | Sunk |
| 25 January 1940 | Alsacien | France | 2,769 | Sunk |
| 28 January 1940 | Flora | Greece | 2,980 | Sunk |

== Bibliography ==
- Busch, Rainer; Röll, Hans-Joachim (1999). German U-boat commanders of World War II : a biographical dictionary. Translated by Brooks, Geoffrey. London, Annapolis, Md: Greenhill Books, Naval Institute Press. ISBN 1-55750-186-6.
- Busch, Rainer; Röll, Hans-Joachim (1999). Deutsche U-Boot-Verluste von September 1939 bis Mai 1945 [German U-boat losses from September 1939 to May 1945]. Der U-Boot-Krieg (in German). Vol. IV. Hamburg, Berlin, Bonn: Mittler. ISBN 3-8132-0514-2.
- Gröner, Erich; Jung, Dieter; Maass, Martin (1991). U-boats and Mine Warfare Vessels. German Warships 1815–1945. Vol. 2. Translated by Thomas, Keith; Magowan, Rachel. London: Conway Maritime Press. ISBN 0-85177-593-4.
