= Viktor Schütze =

German U-boat commander (1906–1950)

- Born: 16 February 1906; Flensburg, German Empire
- Died: 23 September 1950 (aged 44); Frankfurt am Main, West Germany
- Military career
- Allegiance: Weimar Republic; Nazi Germany
- Branch: Reichsmarine; Kriegsmarine
- Service years: 1925–45
- Rank: Kapitän zur See
- Commands: U-19 U-11; U-25; U-103; 2nd U-boat Flotilla FdU Ausbildungsflottillen Gotenhafen
- Conflicts: Battle of the Atlantic
- Awards: Knight's Cross of the Iron Cross

Kapitän zur See Viktor Schütze (16 February 1906 – 23 September 1950) was a German U-boat commander during World War II. He was a recipient of the Knight's Cross of the Iron Cross with Oak Leaves of Nazi Germany.

Schütze was born in Flensburg and started his naval career in the Reichsmarine aboard German torpedo boats in April 1925, before transferring to the new U-boat division ten years later in October 1935. There he commanded U-19 for two years, before being relieved to take destroyer training - before returning to the U-boat arm in command of U-11. When war broke out he commanded U-25, with which he sailed on three patrols, mainly in the Bay of Biscay and off the Portuguese coast.

In July 1940 he assumed command of the new Type IXB U-103, for four patrols in North Atlantic and African waters. U-103 was one of the most successful boats in the entire war, sinking 238,944 gross register tons (GRT) of Allied shipping in 11 patrols, in a career lasting more than four years. Schütze was her first commander, and in the boats's first four patrols he sank 26 cargo and tanker ships. In December 1940 he received the Knight's Cross of the Iron Cross with Oak Leaves for his successes. In August 1941 he retired from front service, taking up the position as Flottillenchef of 2nd U-boat Flotilla. In March 1943 he became the FdU Ausbildungsflottillen (Commander of the training flotillas in the Baltic Sea) in Flensburg-Kappeln, in which position he served until the end of the war. He was detained as a prisoner of war in a British camp from May 1945 to March 1946. He died in Frankfurt am Main in 1950.

== Awards ==
- Spanisches Marineverdienstkreuz, I. Class in white (21 August 1939)
- Iron Cross (1939) 2nd Class (13 November 1939) & 1st Class (21 February 1940)
- Italienisches Kriegskreuz with swords (1 November 1941)
- Knight's Cross of the Iron Cross with Oak Leaves
  - Knight's Cross on 11 December 1940 as Korvettenkapitän and commander of U-103
  - Oak Leaves on 14 July 1941 as Korvettenkapitän and commander of U-103
- War Merit Cross with swords, 2nd Class (30 January 1944) & 1st Class (1 September 1944)

Military offices
Preceded by Korvettenkapitän Heinz Fischer	Commander of 2nd U-boat Flotilla; August, 1941 – January, 1943	Succeeded by Fregattenkapitän Ernst Kals
