= Eberhard Godt =

German WW2 navy officer

- Godt in 1944
- Born: Eberhard Friedrich Clemens Godt; 15 August 1900; Lübeck
- Died: 13 September 1995 (aged 95)
- Military career
- Allegiance: German Empire; Weimar Republic; Nazi Germany
- Branch: Imperial German Navy (1918); Reichsmarine (1920–1935); Kriegsmarine (1935–1945)
- Service years: 1918, 1920–1945
- Rank: Konteradmiral
- Units: SMS Schlesien; Marinebrigade Ehrhardt; Cruiser Emden
- Commands: U-25; Chief of U-boat operations
- Conflicts: World War I Spanish Civil War; World War II: Battle of the Atlantic
- Awards: German Cross in Gold (1942)

Eberhard Godt (15 August 1900 – 13 September 1995) was a German naval officer who served in both World War I and World War II, eventually rising to command the Kriegsmarine's U-boat operations.

== Biography ==
This article incorporates information from the equivalent articles on the German Wikipedia

Godt joined the Kaiserliche Marine in summer 1918 as an officer cadet and served on board the SMS Schlesien. After the war he served in the Marinebrigade Ehrhardt. In March 1920 he was accepted in the Reichsmarine, becoming an officer in 1924. He served aboard numerous surface ships and naval installations until 1935; when he was serving on the light cruiser Emden as adjutant to Kapitän zur See Karl Dönitz. Then Korvettenkapitän (Lieutenant Commander) Godt transferred to the newly established U-boat arm; commanding German submarine U-25 during the Spanish Civil War.

In January 1938 he was appointed to the staff of the commander of the U-boat force, Admiral Dönitz. In October he became the force's chief of operations. He continued in this role until January 1943 when he assumed full tactical command of U-Boat operations after Dönitz was promoted to command the Kriegsmarine. In March Godt was promoted to Konteradmiral (Rear Admiral) and assigned, additionally to his U-boat duties, to a department command at the Naval High Command. In 1945 he became a POW and remained in British custody until 1947. During this time he also testified as a witness in the Nuremberg trials.

Following the war he wrote a history of Kriegsmarine operations in World War II as a member of the Naval Historical Team.

Godt died at the age of 95 on 13 September 1995.

== Dates of rank ==
- Seekadett (Junior Cadet): 1 July 1918
- Fähnrich zur See (Senior Cadet): 1 April 1922
- Oberfähnrich zur See (Midshipman): 1 October 1923
- Leutnant zur See (Acting Sub-Lieutenant): 1 April 1924
- Oberleutnant zur See (Sub-Lieutenant): 1 January 1926
- Kapitänleutnant (Lieutenant): 1 July 1933
- Korvettenkapitän (Corvette Captain / Lieutenant Commander): 1 April 1937
- Fregattenkapitän (Frigate Captain / Commander): 1 July 1940
- Kapitän zur See (Line Captain): 1 September 1942
- Konteradmiral (Rear Admiral, Lower Half): 1 March 1943

== Decorations and awards ==
- Iron Cross (1914)
  - 2nd class (1918)
- Hanseatic Cross of Lübeck (1918)
- Clasp to the Iron Cross (1939)
  - 2nd class
- Iron Cross (1939)
  - 1st class
- German Cross in Gold (10 February 1942)

== Bibliography ==
- Busch, Rainer; Röll, Hans-Joachim (1999). German U-boat commanders of World War II : a biographical dictionary. Translated by Brooks, Geoffrey. London, Annapolis, Md: Greenhill Books, Naval Institute Press. ISBN 1-55750-186-6.
