= German submarine U-22 (1936) =

German World War II submarine

Coordinates: 57°30′N 9°00′E

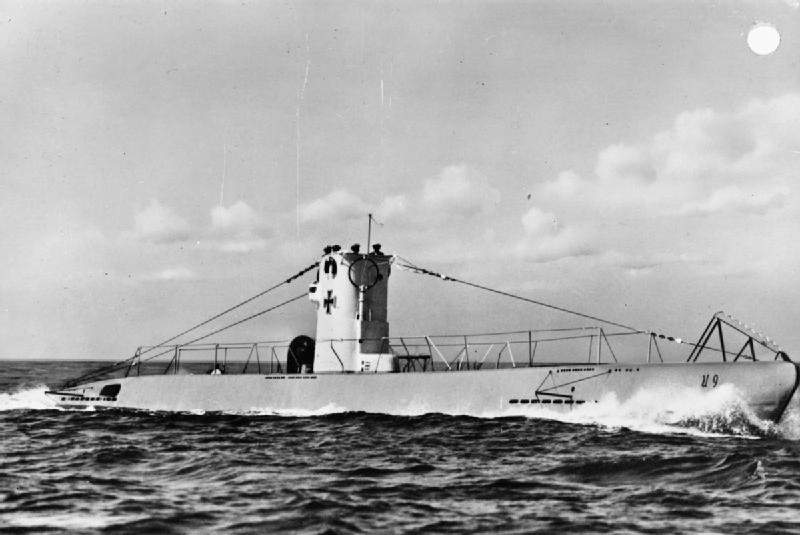
- U-9, a typical Type IIB boat

History

Nazi Germany
- Name: U-22
- Ordered: 2 February 1935
- Builder: Germaniawerft, Kiel
- Yard number: 552
- Laid down: 4 March 1936
- Launched: 29 July 1936
- Commissioned: 20 August 1936
- Fate: Missing since 27 March 1940, in the North Sea around Skagerrak. 27 presumed dead

General characteristics
- Class & type: Type IIB coastal submarine
- Displacement: 279 t (275 long tons) surfaced; 328 t (323 long tons) submerged
- Length: 42.70 m (140 ft 1 in) o/a; 27.80 m (91 ft 2 in) pressure hull
- Beam: 4.08 m (13 ft 5 in) (o/a); 4.00 m (13 ft 1 in) (pressure hull)
- Height: 8.60 m (28 ft 3 in)
- Draught: 3.90 m (12 ft 10 in)
- Installed power: 700 PS (510 kW; 690 bhp) (diesels); 410 PS (300 kW; 400 shp) (electric)
- Propulsion: 2 shafts; 2 × diesel engines; 2 × electric motors
- Speed: 13 knots (24 km/h; 15 mph) surfaced; 7 knots (13 km/h; 8.1 mph) submerged
- Range: 1,800 nmi (3,300 km; 2,100 mi) at 12 knots (22 km/h; 14 mph) surfaced; 35–43 nmi (65–80 km; 40–49 mi) at 4 knots (7.4 km/h; 4.6 mph) submerged
- Test depth: 80 m (260 ft)
- Complement: 3 officers, 22 men
- Armament: 3 × 53.3 cm (21 in) torpedo tubes; 5 × torpedoes or up to 12 TMA or 18 TMB mines; 1 × 2 cm (0.79 in) anti-aircraft gun

Service record
- Part of: 3rd U-boat Flotilla; 1 August 1936 – 1 August 1939; 1 September – 31 December 1939; 1st U-boat Flotilla; 1 January – 27 March 1940
- Identification codes: M 26 177
- Commanders: Kptlt. Harald Grosse; 23 December 1936 – 4 October 1937; Kptlt. Werner Winter; 1 October 1937 – 3 October 1939; Kptlt. Karl-Heinrich Jenisch; 4 October 1939 – 27 March 1940
- Operations: 7 patrols: 1st patrol: 26 August – 9 September 1939; 2nd patrol: a. 27 – 30 September 1939; b. 2 – 3 October 1939; 3rd patrol: 15 – 24 November 1939; 4th patrol: 13 – 24 December 1939; 5th patrol: 15 – 24 January 1940; 6th patrol: 8 – 25 February 1940; 7th patrol: 20 – 27 March 1940
- Victories: 6 merchant ships sunk (7,344 GRT); 1 warship sunk (1,475 tons); 2 auxiliary warships sunk (3,633 GRT)

German submarine U-22 was a Nazi German Type IIB U-boat which was commissioned in 1936 following construction at the Germaniawerft shipyards at Kiel. Her pre-war service was uneventful, as she trained crews and officers in the rapidly expanding U-boat arm of the Kriegsmarine following the abandonment of the terms of the Treaty of Versailles two years before.

== Design ==
German Type IIB submarines were enlarged versions of the original Type IIs. U-22 had a displacement of 279 tonnes (275 long tons) when at the surface and 328 tonnes (323 long tons) while submerged. Officially, the standard tonnage was 250 long tons (250 t), however. The U-boat had a total length of 42.70 m (140 ft 1 in), a pressure hull length of 28.20 m (92 ft 6 in), a beam of 4.08 m (13 ft 5 in), a height of 8.60 m (28 ft 3 in), and a draught of 3.90 m (12 ft 10 in). The submarine was powered by two MWM RS 127 S four-stroke, six-cylinder diesel engines of 700 metric horsepower (510 kW; 690 shp) for cruising, two Siemens-Schuckert PG VV 322/36 double-acting electric motors producing a total of 460 metric horsepower (340 kW; 450 shp) for use while submerged. She had two shafts and two 0.85 m (3 ft) propellers. The boat was capable of operating at depths of up to 80–150 metres (260–490 ft).

The submarine had a maximum surface speed of 12 knots (22 km/h; 14 mph) and a maximum submerged speed of 7 knots (13 km/h; 8.1 mph). When submerged, the boat could operate for 35–42 nautical miles (65–78 km; 40–48 mi) at 4 knots (7.4 km/h; 4.6 mph); when surfaced, she could travel 3,800 nautical miles (7,000 km; 4,400 mi) at 8 knots (15 km/h; 9.2 mph). U-22 was fitted with three 53.3 cm (21 in) torpedo tubes at the bow, five torpedoes or up to twelve Type A torpedo mines, and a 2 cm (0.79 in) anti-aircraft gun. The boat had a complement of twentyfive.

== War Patrols ==
During the Second World War, she was mainly deployed for coastal work, a role enforced by her small size and endurance. Thus she was useful for operations in the North Sea and against the British coastal convoys, particularly along the north east seaboard of Great Britain. It was in this region that she scored her first successes, after fruitless operations off the Polish coast during the invasion of that country and a patrol against British shipping coming from Norwegian ports.

On 18 November 1939, she scored her first kill, sinking the trawler Wigmore off the Scottish coast. In December 1940 she laid mines off Blyth, in Northumberland, which claimed two coastal freighters and a naval patrol minesweeper in less than a week. She was then used directly against Scottish convoys in the Moray Firth, during which she achieved her greatest success, torpedoing the British destroyer HMS Exmouth, which went down with all hands, the cause of her loss only discovered by the British after the war. Shortly afterwards, in thick fog, she sank a Danish ship from the same convoy. These were her final direct victims, although she later claimed another with a mine laid sometime before.

The submarine failed to return from her seventh patrol, for which she had departed on 20 March 1940. There is some indication that she was lost due to an unexplained mine detonation in the Skagerrak. Some suggested, that she might have been rammed by the Polish submarine Wilk, which reported crashing into something, but it was a month later (20 June) and newest analyses show, that the Wilk most probably collided with a buoy. Whatever the cause, U-22 and her 27 crew were never seen again, lost somewhere in the North Sea in March 1940.

== Summary of raiding history ==
Date	Name	Nationality	Tonnage (Note: Merchant ship tonnages are in gross register tons. Military vessels are listed by tons displacement.)	Fate
18 November 1939	Wigmore	United Kingdom	345	Sunk
20 December 1939	Mars	Sweden	1,877	Sunk (mine)
23 December 1939	HMS Dolphin	Royal Navy	3,099	Sunk (mine)
25 December 1939	HMS Loch Doon	Royal Navy	534	Sunk (mine)
28 December 1939	Hanne	Denmark	1,080	Sunk (mine)
21 January 1940	Ferryhill	United Kingdom	1,086	Sunk (mine)
21 January 1940	HMS Exmouth	Royal Navy	1,475	Sunk
21 January 1940	Tekla	Denmark	1,469	Sunk (mine)
28 January 1940	Eston	United Kingdom	1,487	Sunk (mine)

== Bibliography ==
- Busch, Rainer; Röll, Hans-Joachim (1999). German U-boat commanders of World War II : a biographical dictionary. Translated by Brooks, Geoffrey. London, Annapolis, Md: Greenhill Books, Naval Institute Press. ISBN 1-55750-186-6.
- Busch, Rainer; Röll, Hans-Joachim (1999). Deutsche U-Boot-Verluste von September 1939 bis Mai 1945 [German U-boat losses from September 1939 to May 1945]. Der U-Boot-Krieg (in German). Vol. IV. Hamburg, Berlin, Bonn: Mittler. ISBN 3-8132-0514-2.
- Gröner, Erich; Jung, Dieter; Maass, Martin (1991). U-boats and Mine Warfare Vessels. German Warships 1815–1945. Vol. 2. Translated by Thomas, Keith; Magowan, Rachel. London: Conway Maritime Press. ISBN 0-85177-593-4.
- Sharpe, Peter (1998). U-Boat Fact File. Great Britain: Midland Publishing. ISBN 1-85780-072-9.
