= German submarine U-25 (1936) =

German World War II submarine

Coordinates: 54°14′N 5°7′E

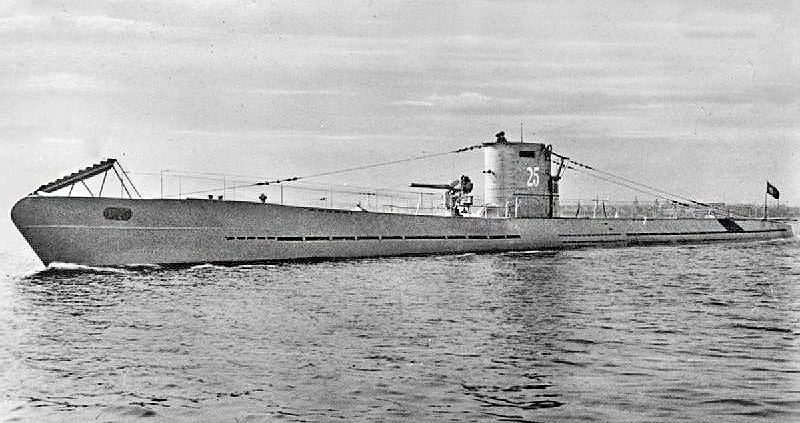
- U-25 in about 1936; the number on the conning tower was removed at the beginning of the war

History

Nazi Germany
- Name: U-25
- Ordered: 17 December 1934
- Builder: DeSchiMAG AG Weser Bremen
- Yard number: 903
- Laid down: 28 June 1935
- Launched: 14 February 1936
- Commissioned: 6 April 1936
- Fate: Sunk by a British mine around 2 August 1940, in the North Sea north of Terschelling

General characteristics
- Type: Type IA ocean-going submarine
- Displacement: 862 t (848 long tons) surfaced; 982 t (966 long tons) submerged; Official displacement was 712 tons standard
- Length: 72.39 m (237 ft 6 in) o/a
- Beam: 6.21 m (20 ft 4 in) o/a
- Draught: 4.30 m (14 ft 1 in)
- Propulsion: Diesel-electric; 2 × MAN M8V40/46 8-cylinder diesel engines with 2,900–3,080 PS (2,860–3,040 shp; 2,130–2,270 kW); 2 × BBC GG UB720/8 double-acting electric motors with 1,000 PS (990 shp; 740 kW)
- Speed: 18.6 knots (34.4 km/h; 21.4 mph) surfaced; 8.3 knots (15.4 km/h; 9.6 mph) submerged
- Range: 7,900 nmi (14,600 km; 9,100 mi) at 10 knots (19 km/h; 12 mph) surfaced; 78 nmi (144 km; 90 mi) at 4 knots (7.4 km/h; 4.6 mph) submerged
- Test depth: 200 m (660 ft)
- Complement: 4 officers, 39 enlisted
- Armament: 6 × 53.3 cm (21 in) torpedo tubes (4 bow, 2 stern); 14 × torpedoes; 28 × TMA mines; 1 × 10.5 cm (4.1 in) SK C/32 naval gun; 1 × 2 cm (0.79 in) C/30 AA gun

Service record
- Part of: 2nd U-boat Flotilla; 1 April 1936 – 2 August 1940
- Identification codes: M 10 950
- Commanders: KrvKpt. Eberhard Godt; 6 April 1936 – 3 January 1938; Kptlt. Werner von Schmidt; 3 January – 12 December 1938; Kptlt. Otto Schuhart; 10 December 1938 – 3 April 1939; Oblt. Georg-Heinz Michel; 4 April – 4 September 1939; Kptlt. / KrvKpt. Viktor Schütze; 5 September 1939 – 19 May 1940; Kptlt. / KrvKpt. Heinz Beduhn; 20 May – 2 August 1940
- Operations: 5 patrols: 1st patrol: 18 October – 19 November 1939; 2nd patrol: 13 January – 19 February 1940; 3rd patrol: 3 April – 6 May 1940; 4th patrol: 8 – 29 June 1940; 5th patrol: 1 – 2 August 1940
- Victories: 7 merchant ships sunk (33,209 GRT); 1 auxiliary warship sunk (17,046 GRT); 1 merchant ship damaged (7,638 GRT)

German submarine U-25 was one of two Type IA ocean-going submarines produced by Nazi Germany's Kriegsmarine. Constructed by DeSchiMAG AG Weser in Bremen as yard number 903, U-25 was commissioned on 6 April 1936. It experienced a short, but successful combat career, sinking eight ships and damaging one.

== Service history ==
Until 1940, U-25 was primarily used as a training vessel. During its trials it was found that the Type IA submarine was difficult to handle due to its poor stability and slow dive rate. In early 1940, the boat was called into combat duty due to the shortage of available submarines. U-25 participated in five war patrols, sinking eight ships and badly damaging one.

On 17 January 1940, 10 miles north of Shetland, U-25 torpedoed SS Polzella. Enid (Captain Wibe), of then-neutral Norway en route to Dublin, went to assist Polzella. U-25 then shelled and sank Enid. Her crew escaped in their lifeboats. None of Polzella's crew survived.

U-25 sank eight vessels for a total of 50,255 gross register tons (GRT) and damaged one for 7,638 GRT.

== Fate ==
Around 2 August 1940, while on a mine-laying mission near Norway, U-25 passed through British minefield Field No. 7, striking a mine. The boat sank, taking all 49 hands with it.

=== Wolfpacks ===
U-25 took part in one wolfpack, namely:

- Prien (12 – 17 June 1940)

== Summary of raiding history ==
Date	Name of Ship	Nationality	Tonnage (Note: Merchant ship tonnages are in gross register tons. Military vessels are listed by tons displacement.)	Fate
31 October 1939	Baoulé	France	5,874	Sunk
17 January 1940	Enid	Norway	1,140	Sunk
17 January 1940	Polzella	United Kingdom	4,751	Sunk
18 January 1940	Pajala	Sweden	6,873	Sunk
22 January 1940	Songa	Norway	2,589	Sunk
3 February 1940	Armanistan	United Kingdom	6,805	Sunk
13 February 1940	Chastine Mærsk	Denmark	5,177	Sunk
13 June 1940	HMS Scotstoun	Royal Navy	17,046	Sunk
19 June 1940	Brumaire	France	7,638	Damaged

== Bibliography ==
- Busch, Rainer; Röll, Hans-Joachim (1999). German U-boat commanders of World War II : a biographical dictionary. Translated by Brooks, Geoffrey. London, Annapolis, Md: Greenhill Books, Naval Institute Press. ISBN 1-55750-186-6.
- Busch, Rainer; Röll, Hans-Joachim (1999). Deutsche U-Boot-Verluste von September 1939 bis Mai 1945 [German U-boat losses from September 1939 to May 1945]. Der U-Boot-Krieg (in German). Vol. IV. Hamburg, Berlin, Bonn: Mittler. ISBN 3-8132-0514-2.
- Gröner, Erich; Jung, Dieter; Maass, Martin (1991). U-boats and Mine Warfare Vessels. German Warships 1815–1945. Vol. 2. Translated by Thomas, Keith; Magowan, Rachel. London: Conway Maritime Press. ISBN 0-85177-593-4.
- Williamson, Gordon (2005). Wolf Pack: The Story of the U-Boat in World War II. Osprey. ISBN 9781841768724.
