= German submarine U-20 (1936) =

German World War II submarine

Coordinates: 41°10′N 30°47′E

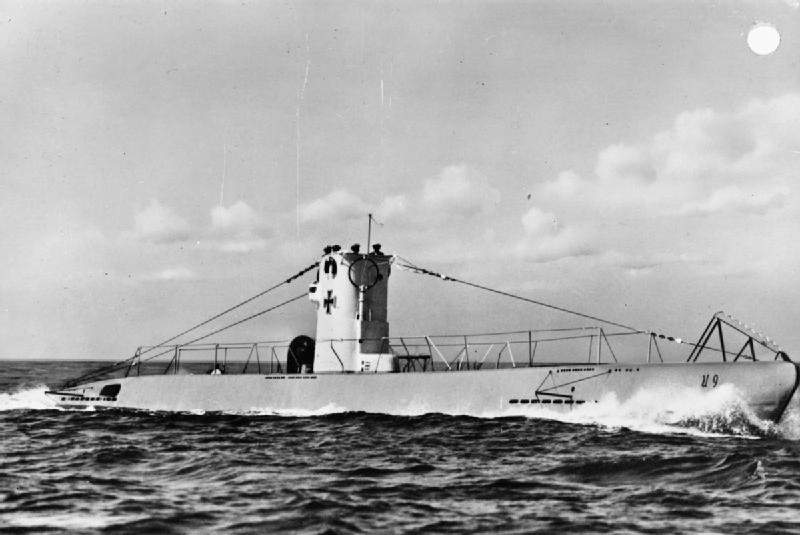
- U-9, a typical Type IIB boat

History

Nazi Germany
- Name: U-20
- Ordered: 2 February 1935
- Builder: Germaniawerft, Kiel; Galați shipyard, Romania
- Yard number: 550
- Laid down: 1 August 1935
- Launched: 14 January 1936
- Commissioned: 1 February 1936
- Fate: Scuttled 11 September 1944, off the coast of Turkey in the Black Sea

General characteristics
- Class & type: Type IIB coastal submarine
- Displacement: 279 t (275 long tons) surfaced; 328 t (323 long tons) submerged
- Length: 42.70 m (140 ft 1 in) o/a; 27.80 m (91 ft 2 in) pressure hull
- Beam: 4.08 m (13 ft 5 in) (o/a); 4.00 m (13 ft 1 in) (pressure hull)
- Height: 8.60 m (28 ft 3 in)
- Draught: 3.90 m (12 ft 10 in)
- Installed power: 700 PS (510 kW; 690 bhp) (diesels); 410 PS (300 kW; 400 shp) (electric)
- Propulsion: 2 shafts; 2 × diesel engines; 2 × electric motors
- Speed: 13 knots (24 km/h; 15 mph) surfaced; 7 knots (13 km/h; 8.1 mph) submerged
- Range: 1,800 nmi (3,300 km; 2,100 mi) at 12 knots (22 km/h; 14 mph) surfaced; 35–43 nmi (65–80 km; 40–49 mi) at 4 knots (7.4 km/h; 4.6 mph) submerged
- Test depth: 80 m (260 ft)
- Complement: 3 officers, 22 men
- Armament: 3 × 53.3 cm (21 in) torpedo tubes; 5 × torpedoes or up to 12 TMA or 18 TMB mines; 1 × 2 cm (0.79 in) anti-aircraft gun

Service record
- Part of: 3rd U-boat Flotilla; 1 February – 1 August 1939; 1 September – 31 December 1939; 1st U-boat Flotilla; 1 January – 30 April 1940; 1st U-boat Training Flotilla; 1 May – 30 June 1940; 21st U-boat Flotilla; 1 July 1940 – 26 August 1942; 30th U-boat Flotilla; 27 May 1943 – 10 September 1944
- Identification codes: M 29 241
- Commanders: Kptlt. Hans Eckermann; 1 February 1936 – 30 September 1937; Oblt.z.S. / Kptlt. Karl-Heinz Moehle; 1 October 1937 – 17 January 1940; Kptlt. Harro von Klot-Heydenfeldt; 17 January – 15 April 1940; Oblt.z.S. Heinrich Driver; 2 – 15 April 1940; Oblt.z.S. Hans-Jürgen Zetzsche; 16 April – 7 June 1940; Oblt.z.S. Ottokar Arnold Paulshen; 8 June 1940 – 5 January 1941; Kptlt. Herbert Schauenburg; 6 January – 19 May 1941; Oblt.z.S. Wolfgang Sträter; 20 May – 4 December 1941; Oblt.z.S. Kurt Nölke; 5 December 1941 – 27 March 1942; Oblt.z.S. / Kptlt. Clemens Schöler; 7 May – 26 August 1942; 27 May – 31 October 1943; Oblt.z.S. Karl Grafen; 1 November 1943 – 10 September 1944
- Operations: 16 patrols: 1st patrol: a. 24 – 31 August 1939; b. 1 – 20 September 1939; 2nd patrol: a. 29 September – 17 October 1939; b. 6 – 7 November 1939; 3rd patrol: 18 – 24 November 1939; 4th patrol: 7 – 13 December 1939; 5th patrol: 6 – 16 January 1940; 6th patrol: a. 21 January 1940; b. 23 – 31 January 1940; c. 4 February 1940; 7th patrol: 27 February – 4 March 1940; 8th patrol: a. 14 – 20 March 1940; b. 21 – 22 March 1940; 9th patrol: 22 – 29 June 1943; 10th patrol: 11 July – 7 August 1943; 11th patrol: a. 16 – 22 September 1943; b. 24 September – 12 October 1943; 12th patrol: 8 November – 9 December 1943; 13th patrol: 1 – 26 January 1944; 14th patrol: a. 22 February – 1 March 1944; b. 2 – 27 March 1944; 15th patrol: 11 June – 11 July 1944; 16th patrol: 19 August – 10 September 1944
- Victories: 12 merchant ships sunk (30,058 GRT); 1 warship sunk (9 tons); 2 merchant ships total loss (8,446 GRT); 1 merchant ship damaged (1,846 GRT)

German submarine U-20 was a Type IIB U-boat of Nazi Germany's Kriegsmarine. Her keel was laid down on 1 August 1935, by Germaniawerft of Kiel as yard number 550. She was commissioned on 1 February 1936. During World War II, she conducted operations against enemy shipping.

U-20 went on 16 war patrols, sinking 13 ships totalling 30,058 GRT and 9 tons, damaging one more of 1,846 GRT.

== Design ==
German Type IIB submarines were enlarged versions of the original Type IIs. U-20 had a displacement of 279 tonnes (275 long tons) when at the surface and 328 tonnes (323 long tons) while submerged. Officially, the standard tonnage was 250 long tons (254 t), however. The U-boat had a total length of 42.70 m (140 ft 1 in), a pressure hull length of 28.20 m (92 ft 6 in), a beam of 4.08 m (13 ft 5 in), a height of 8.60 m (28 ft 3 in), and a draught of 3.90 m (12 ft 10 in). The submarine was powered by two MWM RS 127 S four-stroke, six-cylinder diesel engines of 700 metric horsepower (510 kW; 690 shp) for cruising, two Siemens-Schuckert PG VV 322/36 double-acting electric motors producing a total of 460 metric horsepower (340 kW; 450 shp) for use while submerged. She had two shafts and two 0.85 m (3 ft) propellers. The boat was capable of operating at depths of up to 80–150 metres (260–490 ft).

The submarine had a maximum surface speed of 12 knots (22 km/h; 14 mph) and a maximum submerged speed of 7 knots (13 km/h; 8.1 mph). When submerged, the boat could operate for 35–42 nautical miles (65–78 km; 40–48 mi) at 4 knots (7.4 km/h; 4.6 mph); when surfaced, she could travel 3,800 nautical miles (7,000 km; 4,400 mi) at 8 knots (15 km/h; 9.2 mph). U-20 was fitted with three 53.3 cm (21 in) torpedo tubes at the bow, five torpedoes or up to twelve Type A torpedo mines, and a 2 cm (0.79 in) anti-aircraft gun. The boat had a complement of twenty five.

== Operational history ==
=== First, second and third patrols ===
U-20's first three patrols involved observation (in August 1939) and the laying of mines in the North Sea and off the British east coast. She would start in Kiel and finish in Wilhelmshaven; then reverse the process.

=== Fourth and fifth patrols ===
She sank Magnus about 40 nmi (74 km; 46 mi) east northeast of Peterhead in Scotland. The ship went down in 90 seconds; there was only one survivor. She also sank Ionian and Willowpool in November and December respectively, with mines laid in November.

The boat sank Sylvia northeast of Aberdeen on her fifth sortie on 13 October 1940.

=== Sixth to eighth patrols ===
U-20 sank a steady number of ships on her sixth and seventh patrols, (her eighth foray was relatively quiet), but a series of changes were on the way.

She was transferred to the U-Ausbildungsflottille as a school boat on 1 May 1940, then the Black Sea, avoiding the heavy British presence at Gibraltar and throughout the Mediterranean by being transported in sections along the Danube to the Romanian port of Galați. She was then re-assembled by the Romanians at the Galați shipyard and sent to her new home in the Black Sea so she could serve with the 30th U-boat Flotilla.

=== Ninth and tenth patrols ===
The boat's first patrol in the new environment, but her ninth overall, almost ended in disaster when she tried to torpedo a Soviet submarine chaser; the vessel responded by dropping eight depth charges. U-20 was obliged to stay submerged for four hours and returned to base with various mechanical failures.

Near the end of sally number ten, a crew member from U-19 who had been taken sick, was transferred to U-20 on 4 August 1943. The boat docked at Constanta on the seventh.

=== 11th to 14th patrols ===
These patrols were conducted between Constanta and Sevastopol. U-20 sank the Soviet Vaijan Kutur'e on 16 January 1944 off Cape Anakria.

=== 15th patrol ===
The boat sank Pestel on 19 June 1944 off Trabzon. The Soviets reported that this ship was sunk in Turkish territorial waters.

She also sank the Soviet landing craft DB-26 on 26 June with gunfire and demolition charges.

=== 16th patrol and fate ===
She was scuttled on 10 September 1944, in the Black Sea off the coast of Turkey.

On 3 February 2008, The Daily Telegraph newspaper reported that U-20 had been discovered by Selçuk Kolay, a Turkish marine engineer, in 80 feet (24 m) of water off the coast of the Turkish city of Karasu.

== Summary of raiding history ==
Date	Name	Nationality	Tonnage (Note: Merchant ship tonnages are in gross register tons. Military vessels are listed by tons displacement.)	Fate
29 November 1939	Ionian	United Kingdom	3,114	Sunk (mine)
9 December 1939	Magnus	Denmark	1,339	Sunk
10 December 1939	Føina	Norway	1,674	Sunk
10 December 1939	Willowpool	United Kingdom	4,815	Sunk (mine)
13 January 1940	Sylvia	Sweden	1,524	Sunk
27 January 1940	England	Denmark	2,319	Sunk
27 January 1940	Faro	Norway	844	Total loss
27 January 1940	Fredensborg	Denmark	2,094	Sunk
27 January 1940	Hosanger	Denmark	1,591	Sunk
29 February 1940	Maria Rosa	Italy	4,211	Sunk
1 March 1940	Mirella	Italy	5,340	Sunk
29 November 1943	Peredovik	Soviet Union	1,846	Damaged
16 January 1944	Vaijan Kutur'e	Soviet Union	7,602	Total loss
7 April 1944	Rion	Soviet Union	187	Sunk (mine)
19 June 1944	Pestel	Soviet Union	1,850	Sunk
24 June 1944	DB-26	Soviet Navy	9	Sunk

== Bibliography ==
- Busch, Rainer; Röll, Hans-Joachim (1999). German U-boat commanders of World War II: a biographical dictionary. Translated by Brooks, Geoffrey. London, Annapolis, Md: Greenhill Books, Naval Institute Press. ISBN 1-55750-186-6.
- Busch, Rainer; Röll, Hans-Joachim (1999). Der U-Boot-Krieg, 1939-1945: Deutsche U-Boot-Verluste von September 1939 bis Mai 1945 [The U-Boat War, 1939-1945: German U-boat losses from September 1939 to May 1945] (in German). Vol. IV. Hamburg, Berlin, Bonn: Mittler. ISBN 3-8132-0514-2.
- Gröner, Erich; Jung, Dieter; Maass, Martin (1991). "U-boats and Mine Warfare Vessels". German Warships 1815–1945. Vol. 2. Translated by Thomas, Keith; Magowan, Rachel. London: Conway Maritime Press. ISBN 0-85177-593-4.
- Kemp, Paul (1999). U-Boats Destroyed - German Submarine Losses in the World Wars. London: Arms & Armour. ISBN 1-85409-515-3.
