= German submarine U-23 (1936) =

German World War II submarine

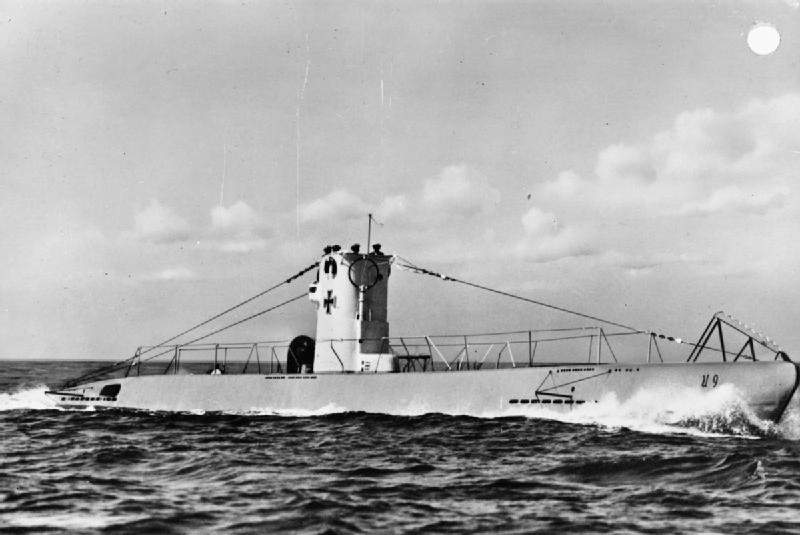
- U-9, a typical Type IIB boat

History

Nazi Germany
- Name: U-23
- Ordered: 2 February 1935
- Builder: Germaniawerft, Kiel; Galați shipyard, Romania
- Yard number: 553
- Laid down: 11 April 1936
- Launched: 28 August 1936
- Commissioned: 24 September 1936
- Fate: Scuttled 11 September 1944, off the coast of Turkey in the Black Sea

General characteristics
- Class & type: Type IIB coastal submarine
- Displacement: 279 t (275 long tons) surfaced; 328 t (323 long tons) submerged
- Length: 42.70 m (140 ft 1 in) o/a; 27.80 m (91 ft 2 in) pressure hull
- Beam: 4.08 m (13 ft 5 in) (o/a); 4.00 m (13 ft 1 in) (pressure hull)
- Height: 8.60 m (28 ft 3 in)
- Draught: 3.90 m (12 ft 10 in)
- Installed power: 700 PS (510 kW; 690 bhp) (diesels); 410 PS (300 kW; 400 shp) (electric)
- Propulsion: 2 shafts; 2 × diesel engines; 2 × electric motors
- Speed: 13 knots (24 km/h; 15 mph) surfaced; 7 knots (13 km/h; 8.1 mph) submerged
- Range: 1,800 nmi (3,300 km; 2,100 mi) at 12 knots (22 km/h; 14 mph) surfaced; 35–43 nmi (65–80 km; 40–49 mi) at 4 knots (7.4 km/h; 4.6 mph) submerged
- Test depth: 80 m (260 ft)
- Complement: 3 officers, 22 men
- Armament: 3 × 53.3 cm (21 in) torpedo tubes; 5 × torpedoes or up to 12 TMA or 18 TMB mines; 1 × 2 cm (0.79 in) anti-aircraft gun

Service record
- Part of: 1st U-boat Flotilla; 1 September 1936 – 1 August 1939; 1 September 1939 – 30 June 1940; 21st U-boat Flotilla; 1 July 1940 – 26 Aug 1942; 30th U-boat Flotilla; 3 June 1943 – 10 September 1944
- Identification codes: M 01 984
- Commanders: Kptlt. / K.Kapt. Eberhard Godt; 1 September 1936 – 3 January 1938; Kptlt. Hans-Günther Looff; 1936 / 37 – 30 September 1937; Oblt.z.S. / Kptlt. Otto Kretschmer; 1 October 1937 – 1 April 1940; Kptlt. Heinz Beduhn; 8 April – 19 May 1940; Oblt.z.S. Heinrich Driver; 20 May – 30 September 1940; Oblt.z.S. Kurt Reichenbach-Klinke; 1 October 1940 – 20 March 1941; Oblt.z.S. Ernst-Ulrich Brüller; 21 March – 23 September 1941; Oblt.z.S. Ulrich Gräf; 24 September 1941 – 26 March 1942; Oblt.z.S. / Kptlt. Rolf-Birger Wahlen; 27 March – 26 August 1942; 3 June 1943 – 19 June 1944; Oblt.z.S. Rudolf Arendt; 20 June – 10 September 1944
- Operations: 16 patrols: 1st patrol: 25 August – 4 September 1939; 2nd patrol: a. 9 – 21 September 1939; b. 29 – 30 September 1939; 3rd patrol: 1 – 16 October 1939; 4th patrol: 1 – 9 November 1939; 5th patrol: 5 – 15 December 1939; 6th patrol: 8 – 15 January 1940; 7th patrol: 18 – 29 January 1940; 8th patrol: a. 9 – 25 February 1940; b. 26 – 28 February 1940; c. 9 – 10 April 1940; 9th patrol: 13 April – 3 May 1940; 10th patrol: a. 27 June – 16 July 1943; b. 18 – 19 July 1943; 11th patrol: 10 August – 9 September 1943; 12th patrol: 10 October – 11 November 1943; 13th patrol: 14 December 1943 – 7 January 1944; 14th patrol: 30 March – 24 April 1944; 15th patrol: 17 May – 7 June 1944; 16th patrol: 16 August – 10 September 1944
- Victories: 7 merchant ships sunk (11,179 GRT); 2 warships sunk (1,410 tons); 3 merchant ships total loss (18,199 GRT); 1 warship damaged (56 tons); 1 auxiliary warship damaged (1,005 GRT)

German submarine U-23 was a Type IIB U-boat of Nazi Germany's Kriegsmarine, built in Germaniawerft, Kiel. She was laid down on 11 April 1936 and commissioned on 24 September.

== Design ==
German Type IIB submarines were enlarged versions of the original Type IIs. U-23 had a displacement of 279 tonnes (275 long tons) when at the surface and 328 tonnes (323 long tons) while submerged. Officially, the standard tonnage was 250 long tons (254 t), however. The U-boat had a total length of 42.70 m (140 ft 1 in), a pressure hull length of 28.20 m (92 ft 6 in), a beam of 4.08 m (13 ft 5 in), a height of 8.60 m (28 ft 3 in), and a draught of 3.90 m (12 ft 10 in). The submarine was powered by two MWM RS 127 S four-stroke, six-cylinder diesel engines of 700 metric horsepower (510 kW; 690 shp) for cruising, two Siemens-Schuckert PG VV 322/36 double-acting electric motors producing a total of 460 metric horsepower (340 kW; 450 shp) for use while submerged. She had two shafts and two 0.85 m (3 ft) propellers. The boat was capable of operating at depths of up to 80–150 metres (260–490 ft).

The submarine had a maximum surface speed of 12 knots (22 km/h; 14 mph) and a maximum submerged speed of 7 knots (13 km/h; 8.1 mph). When submerged, the boat could operate for 35–42 nautical miles (65–78 km; 40–48 mi) at 4 knots (7.4 km/h; 4.6 mph); when surfaced, she could travel 3,800 nautical miles (7,000 km; 4,400 mi) at 8 knots (15 km/h; 9.2 mph). U-23 was fitted with three 53.3 cm (21 in) torpedo tubes at the bow, five torpedoes or up to twelve Type A torpedo mines, and a 2 cm (0.79 in) anti-aircraft gun. The boat had a complement of twentyfive.

== Service history ==
At 04:45 on 4 October 1939, U-23 scored one of the Kriegsmarine's early successes of the war when she torpedoed and sank with gunfire, the merchant ship Glen Farg about 60 nmi (110 km; 69 mi) south-southwest of Sumburgh Head (southern Shetland). One person died, while 16 survivors were picked up by HMS Firedrake and landed at Kirkwall the next day.

In 16 patrols U-23 sank seven ships for a total of 11,179 gross register tons (GRT) including two warships, as well as damaging a warship and an auxiliary warship.

Over the course of her service with the Kriegsmarine, U-23 had ten commanding officers, the most famous of whom was Kapitänleutnant Otto Kretschmer, who went on to become the top scoring U-boat ace. After service in the Atlantic with the 1st U-boat Flotilla, U-23 served as a training boat with the 21st U-boat Flotilla from July 1940 until September 1942. U-23 was then transported in sections along the Danube to the Romanian port of Galați. She was then re-assembled by the Romanians at the Galați shipyard and sent to the Black Sea port of Constanţa, Romania, with the 30th U-boat Flotilla until September 1944.

== Fate ==
U-23 was scuttled by her crew on 10 September 1944, off the coast of Turkey in the Black Sea at position 41°11′N 30°00′E to prevent her capture by the advancing Soviets.

On 3 February 2008, The Daily Telegraph newspaper reported that U-23 had been discovered by Selçuk Kolay, a Turkish marine engineer, in 160 ft (49 m) of water, three miles from the town of Ağva.

== Summary of raiding history ==
Date	Name	Nationality	Tonnage (Note: Merchant ship tonnages are in gross register tons. Military vessels are listed by tons displacement.)	Fate
4 October 1939	Glen Farg	United Kingdom	876	Sunk
8 December 1939	Scotia	Denmark	2,400	Sunk
11 January 1940	Fredville	Norway	1,150	Sunk
12 January 1940	Danmark	Denmark	10,517	Total loss
23 January 1940	Varild	Norway	1,085	Sunk
18 February 1940	HMS Daring	Royal Navy	1,375	Sunk
19 February 1940	Tiberton	United Kingdom	5,225	Sunk
22 February 1940	Loch Maddy	United Kingdom	4,996	Total loss
24 August 1943	Shkval	Soviet Navy	35	Sunk
15 October 1943	TSC-486 Sovetskja Rossiya	Soviet Navy	1,005	Damaged
23 October 1943	Tanais	Soviet Union	372	Sunk
5 April 1944	SKA-099	Soviet Navy	56	Damaged
29 May 1944	Smelyj	Soviet Union	71	Sunk
1 September 1944	Oituz	Romania	2,686	Sunk

== Bibliography ==
- Busch, Rainer; Röll, Hans-Joachim (1999). German U-boat commanders of World War II : a biographical dictionary. Translated by Brooks, Geoffrey. London, Annapolis, Md: Greenhill Books, Naval Institute Press. ISBN 1-55750-186-6.
- Busch, Rainer; Röll, Hans-Joachim (1999). Deutsche U-Boot-Verluste von September 1939 bis Mai 1945 [German U-boat losses from September 1939 to May 1945]. Der U-Boot-Krieg (in German). Vol. IV. Hamburg, Berlin, Bonn: Mittler. ISBN 3-8132-0514-2.
- Gröner, Erich; Jung, Dieter; Maass, Martin (1991). U-boats and Mine Warfare Vessels. German Warships 1815–1945. Vol. 2. Translated by Thomas, Keith; Magowan, Rachel. London: Conway Maritime Press. ISBN 0-85177-593-4.
