= German trawler V 317 Wega =

Ship built in 1931

History
- Name: Walter Schües (1931–33); Wega (1933–55)
- Owner: Hochseefischerei Carl Kämpf Partenreederei (1932–33); Nordstern AG (1933–39); Kriegsmarine (1939–45); Nordstern AG (1945–55)
- Port of registry: (Weimar Republic) Wesermünde, Germany (1932–33); (Nazi Germany) Wesermünde, Germany (1933–39); Kriegsmarine (1939–45); Wesermünde, Allied-occupied Germany (1945–48); Bremerhaven, Allied-occupied Germany (1948–49); Bremerhaven, West Germany (1949-50)
- Builder: Schiffsbau Gesellschaft Unterweser AG
- Yard number: 245
- Launched: 23 December 1931
- Completed: 2 February 1932
- Commissioned: 19 November 1939
- Decommissioned: 3 September 1945
- Out of service: 1955
- Identification: Code Letters KSBF (1932–34); Fishing boat registration PG 406 (1932–39); Code Letters DFAM (1934–55); "Schiff 7" (1939–44); Pennant Number V 316 (1944–45)
- Fate: Scrapped

General characteristics
- Type: Fishing trawler (1931–39); Auxiliary warship (1939–43); Vorpostenboot (1943–45); Fishing trawler (1945–55)
- Tonnage: 337 GRT, 128 NRT
- Length: 47.83 m (156 ft 11 in)
- Beam: 7.70 m (25 ft 3 in)
- Draught: 3.35 m (11 ft 0 in)
- Depth: 4.36 m (14 ft 4 in)
- Installed power: Compound steam engine, 98nhp
- Propulsion: Single screw propeller
- Speed: 11 knots (20 km/h)

Wega was a German fishing trawler that was built in 1931 as Walter Schües. She was sold and renamed Wega in 193. She was requisitioned by the Kriegsmarine in the Second World War initially service as Schiff 7 and later as a Vorpostenboot, serving as V 317 Wega. Returned to her owners post-war, she was scrapped in 1955.

== Description ==
The ship 47.83 metres (156 ft 11 in) long, with a beam of 7.70 metres (25 ft 3 in). She had a depth of 4.36 metres (14 ft 4 in) and a draught of 3.35 metres (11 ft 0 in). She was assessed at 337 GRT, 128 NRT. She was powered by a compound steam engine, which had two cylinders of 31 centimetres (12 3/8 in) and two cylinders of 68 centimetres (26 3/4 in) diameter by 68 centimetres (26 3/4 in)stroke. The engine was built by Christiansen & Meyer, Harburg, Germany. It was rated at 98nhp. It drove a single screw propeller via double reduction gearing and a low pressure turbine The turbine was built by Deutsche Schiff- und Maschinenbau, Bremen, Germany. It could propel the ship at 11 knots (20 km/h).

== History ==
Walter Schües was built as yard number 245 by Schiffsbau Gesellschaft Unterweser AG, Unterweser Germany for the Hochseefischerei Carl Kämpf Partenreederei, Wesermünde. She was launched on 23 December 1931 and completed on 2 February 1932. The fishing boat registration PG 285 was allocated, as were the Code Letters KSBF. Her port of registry was Wesermünde. In March 1933, Walter Schües was sold to Nordstern AG. In 1934, her Code Letters were changed to DFAM.

Wega was requisitioned on 4 September 1939. Deutsche Schiff- und Maschinenbau started her conversion for naval service the next day. On 29 November, she was commissioned into Kriegsmarine service as Schiff 7 Wega with 18 Vorpostengruppe. On 16 January 1940, she ran aground on the Langhoft Tonne, in the Baltic Sea. She was later refloated. On 18 May 1940, Schiff 7 Wega and the torpedo boat Skarv escorted the steamship Tyrifjord from Stavanger to Bergen, Norway. Tyrifjord was transporting a heavy anti-aircraft battery. The next day, she sailed to Florø to escort the captured Norwegian warships HNoMS B-6, HNoMS Gor, HNoMS Snøgg, HNoMS Troll and HNoMS Vale to Bergen. Other escorting vessels were Achilles, Schiff 18 and two vorpostenboote from 15 Vorpostenflotille. On 26 May, Schiff 7 Wega sailed to Molde, where she acted as a harbour protection vessel.

In late July, Schiff 7 Wega was ordered to Trondheim to take part in a special operation with Schiff 18 Alteland and Schiff 47. On 3 October, 18 Vorpostengruppe was redesignated 18 Vorpostenflotille. On 26 January 1941, Schiff 7 Wega stopped the Finnish steamship Pluto, which was on a voyage from Petsamo, Finland to Buenos Aires, Argentina. Pluto was escorted in to Vardø, Norway. On 30 January, she stopped the Finnish steamship Brita Thorden, which was on a voyage from New York, United States to Petsamo. She was also escorted in to Vardø. Two days later, Schiff 7 Wega stopped the Finnish steamship Tauri, which was on a voyage from Petsamo to Cuba. Tauriwas escorted in to Vardø. On 5 February, she stopped the Finnish steamship Aagot, which was on a voyage from Petsamo to Buenos Aires. She was escorted in to Vardø. On 8 March, she stopped the Finnish steamships Anja, on a voyage from Buenos Aires to Petsamo, Josefina Thorden, voyage unknown, and Tornator, on a voyage from Petsamo to Yokohama, Japan. All three were escorted in to Vardø.

On 1 July 1942, Schiff 7 Wega was allocated to 9 Vorpostenflotille. On 1 May 1943, she was allocated to 3 Vorpostenflotille. From August 1943 to April 1944 she underwent a rebuild at Norderwerft. On 27 April 1944, she was redesignated V 317 Wega. On 3 September 1945, she arrived at Seebeckwerft, Bremen for decommissioning. She was subsequently returned to her owners. From 1 February 1948, her port of registry was Bremerhaven. Wega arrived at W. Ritscher, Hamburg for scrapping on 30 August 1955 and was scrapped during September.

== Sources ==
- Gröner, Erich (1993). Die deutschen Kriegsschiffe 1815-1945 (in German). Vol. 8/I: Flußfahrzeuge, Ujäger, Vorpostenboote, Hilfsminensucher, Küstenschutzverbände (Teil 1). Koblenz: Bernard & Graefe. ISBN 3-7637-4807-5.
