= HMS Exmouth (H02) =

E-class destroyer for the Royal Navy in the 1930s

Coordinates: 58°18′N 2°25′W

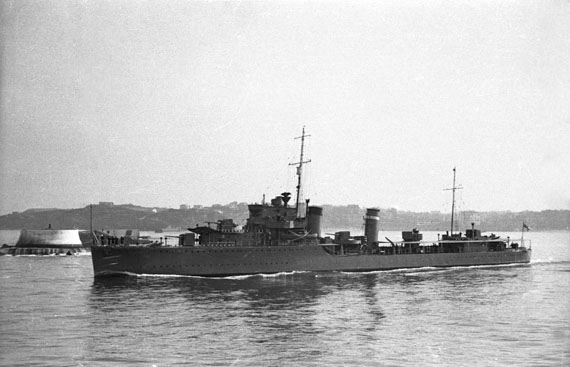
- HMS Exmouth leaving the port of Bilbao, Basque Country, 1936.

History

United Kingdom
- Name: HMS Exmouth
- Ordered: 1 November 1932
- Builder: Portsmouth Dockyard
- Laid down: 15 March 1933
- Launched: 30 January 1934
- Commissioned: 9 November 1934
- Motto: Deo Adjuvante; ("By God’s help")
- Honours and awards: Atlantic 1939
- Fate: Sunk 21 January 1940
- Badge: On a Field Red, a lion passant Gold

General characteristics
- Class & type: E-class destroyer flotilla leader
- Displacement: 1,495 long tons (1,519 t) (standard); 2,050 long tons (2,080 t) (deep load)
- Length: 343 ft (104.5 m) o/a
- Beam: 33 ft 9 in (10.3 m)
- Draught: 12 ft 6 in (3.8 m)
- Installed power: 38,000 shp (28,000 kW); 3 × Admiralty 3-drum boilers
- Propulsion: 2 × shafts, 2 × geared steam turbines
- Speed: 36 knots (67 km/h; 41 mph)
- Range: 6,500 nmi (12,000 km; 7,500 mi) at 15 knots (28 km/h; 17 mph)
- Complement: 175
- Sensors & processing systems: ASDIC
- Armament: 5 × single QF 4.7-inch (120 mm) Mark IX guns; 2 × quadruple QF 0.5-inch (12.7 mm) Vickers Mark III anti-aircraft machine guns; 2 × quadruple 21-inch (533 mm) torpedo tubes; 20 × depth charges, 1 rail and 2 throwers

HMS Exmouth was an E-class destroyer flotilla leader built for the Royal Navy in the early 1930s. Although assigned to the Home Fleet upon completion, the ship was attached to the Mediterranean Fleet in 1935–36 during the Abyssinia Crisis. During the Spanish Civil War of 1936–1939 she spent considerable time in Spanish waters, enforcing the arms blockade imposed by Britain and France on both sides of the conflict. Exmouth was assigned to convoy escort and anti-submarine patrol duties in the Western Approaches when World War II began in September 1939. She was sunk by a German submarine in January 1940 while escorting a merchant ship north of Scotland.

== Description ==
Exmouth displaced 1,495 long tons (1,519 t) at standard load and 2,050 long tons (2,080 t) at deep load. The ship had an overall length of 343 feet (104.5 m), a beam of 33 feet 9 inches (10.3 m) and a draught of 12 feet 6 inches (3.8 m). She was powered by two Parsons geared steam turbines, each driving one propeller shaft, using steam provided by three Admiralty three-drum boilers. The turbines developed a total of 38,000 shaft horsepower (28,000 kW) and gave a maximum speed of 36 knots (67 km/h; 41 mph). Exmouth carried a maximum of 470 long tons (480 t) of fuel oil that gave her a range of 6,350 nautical miles (11,760 km; 7,310 mi) at 15 knots (28 km/h; 17 mph). The ship's complement was 175 officers and ratings.

The ship mounted five 45-calibre 4.7-inch (120 mm) Mark IX guns in single mounts. For anti-aircraft defence, Exmouth had two quadruple Mark I mounts for the 0.5 inch Vickers Mark III machine gun. She was fitted with two above-water quadruple torpedo tube mounts for 21-inch (533 mm) torpedoes. One depth charge rail and two throwers were fitted; 20 depth charges were originally carried, but this increased to 35 shortly after the war began.

== Service ==
Exmouth was ordered on 1 November 1932 under the 1931 Naval Programme, and was laid down at Portsmouth Dockyard on 15 March 1933. She was launched on 30 January 1934, named the following day, and commissioned for service on 9 November 1934. On commissioning, Exmouth was assigned as leader of the 5th Destroyer Flotilla of the Home Fleet. The increased tensions between Italy and Abyssinia – eventually leading to the outbreak of the Second Italo-Abyssinian War – caused the Admiralty to attach the flotilla to the Mediterranean Fleet from August 1935 to March 1936, although Exmouth was refitted in Alexandria from 4 October 1935 to 5 January 1936. The ship patrolled Spanish waters during the Spanish Civil War enforcing the edicts of the Non-Intervention Committee in between annual refits at Portsmouth between 17 November 1936 and 19 January 1937 and 21 November 1938 and 16 January 1939. She returned to Britain in March and Exmouth was assigned to training duties and local flotilla work based at Portsmouth on 28 April. She carried out these duties until 2 August, when she was placed into full commission as the leader of the 12th Destroyer Flotilla.

Exmouth and her flotilla were initially assigned to the Home Fleet upon the outbreak of World War II in September 1939. The ship and two of her flotilla mates, Eclipse and Echo, escorted the battlecruiser Hood as she searched for German commerce raiders south of Iceland in late November. In December, she was transferred to the Western Approaches Command to carry out patrols and escort convoys, but was transferred to Rosyth in January 1940 to carry out the same duties in the North Sea. She was escorting the merchant Cyprian Prince on 21 January 1940 when she was spotted by the German submarine U-22, under the command of Karl-Heinrich Jenisch, and torpedoed at 05:35. She sank with the loss of all hands. After sinking Exmouth, the submarine also fired on Cyprian Prince whose master deemed it too dangerous to pick up survivors. Eighteen bodies were later found washed ashore by a schoolboy playing truant near Wick. They were buried with military honours in the cemetery at Wick.

== Aftermath ==
The wreck of Exmouth was discovered in the Moray Firth in July 2001 by an independent expedition, with their findings being verified by Historic Scotland. The wreck is one of those listed as a 'protected place' under the Protection of Military Remains Act 1986.
