= Werner Lott =

German U-boat commander (1907–1997)

- Born: 3 December 1907; Willenberg
- Died: 2 May 1997 (aged 89)
- Military career
- Allegiance: Nazi Germany
- Branch: Kriegsmarine
- Service years: 1926–1939
- Rank: Korvettenkapitän
- Commands: U-21, September 1936 – 31 March 1936; U-32, 15 April 1936 – 15 August 1936; U-35, 15 August 1937 – 29 November 1939
- Conflicts: Battle of the Atlantic
- Awards: Iron cross, 2nd class

Werner Lott (3 December 1907 – 2 May 1997) was a German U-boat commander in World War II. He was taken prisoner on 29 November 1939 after he ordered his boat scuttled in the North Sea at position 60°53′N 2°47′E after having been depth-charged by HMS Kingston, HMS Kashmir and HMS Icarus.

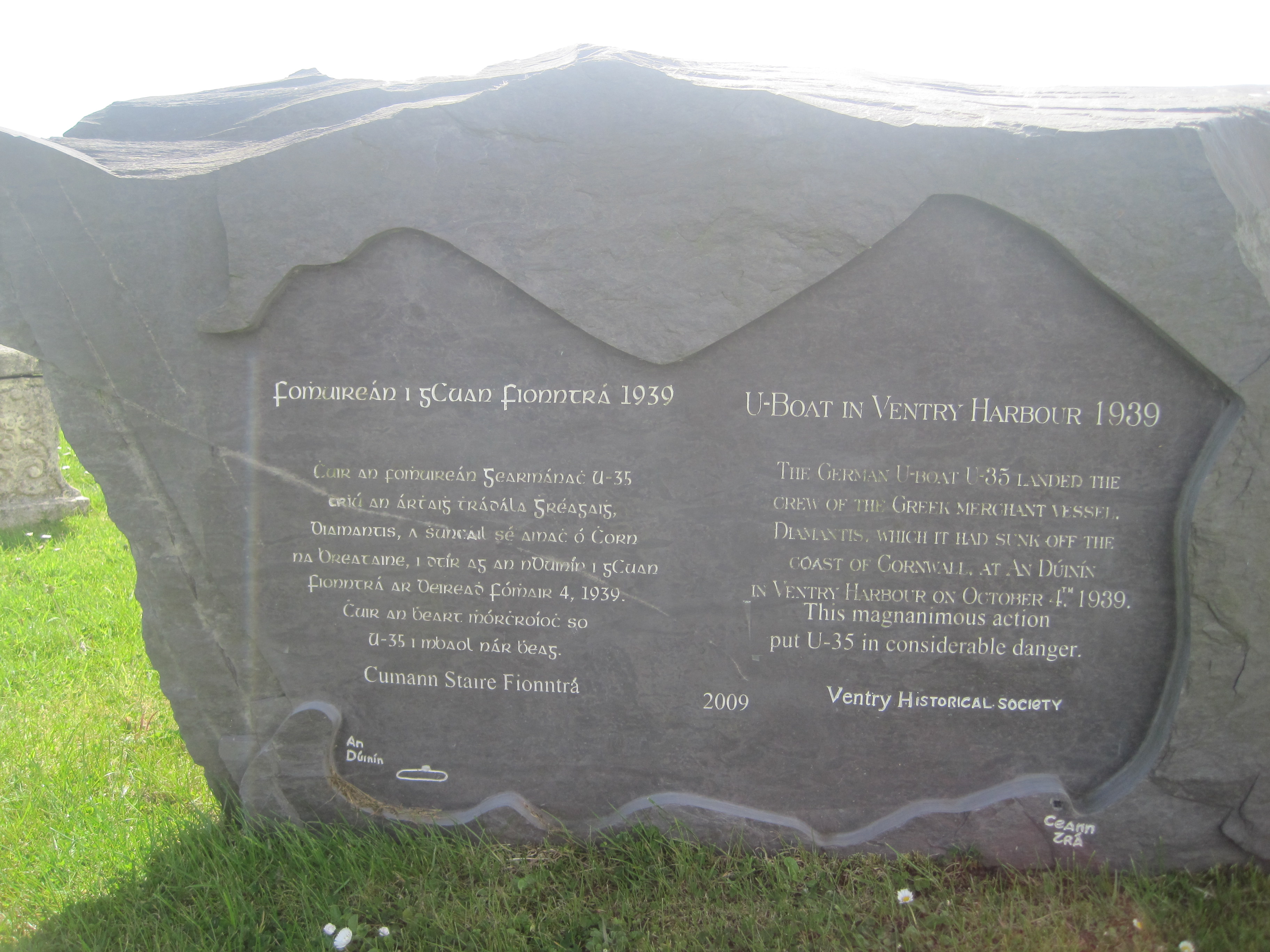
Memorial to U-35 in Ventry, Ireland

He was famously known for his humanity and being responsible for saving the lives of 28 Greek sailors whose ship he torpedoed; his submarine U-35 rescued the sailors who were treated with the utmost decency and landed them safely on a County Kerry beach in what was one of only two such instances when a German submarine crew risked its own safety to protect the crew of a vessel they torpedoed and sank. Another incident involving Lott happened while a prisoner of war in the Tower of London. He complained about the accommodations, and asked to talk to the officer in charge. Instead, he was visited by Lord Louis Mountbatten, the commander of the flotilla that sank his submarine, who arranged for the Admiralty to allow Lott and his second-in-command to dine at Scott's restaurant on the condition they not try to escape. Lott kept his promise, and was returned to the Tower later that night. A few days later, he and the other officers were moved to the Grizedale P.O.W. Camp. Later, the entire crew was moved to POW camps in Canada.

In 1984 he visited the Kerry man, Jimmy Fenton, who catered for the Greek sailors and posed for a photograph shaking his hand.

== Bibliography ==
- Busch, Rainer; Röll, Hans-Joachim (1999). German U-boat commanders of World War II : a biographical dictionary. Translated by Brooks, Geoffrey. London, Annapolis, Md: Greenhill Books, Naval Institute Press. ISBN 1-55750-186-6.
