= German submarine U-850 =

German World War II submarine

History

Nazi Germany
- Name: U-850
- Ordered: 20 January 1941
- Builder: DeSchiMAG AG Weser, Bremen
- Yard number: 1056
- Laid down: 17 March 1942
- Launched: 7 December 1942
- Commissioned: 17 April 1943
- Fate: Sunk west of Madeira on 20 December 1943 by US aircraft in position 32°54′N 37°1′W

General characteristics
- Class & type: Type IXD2 submarine
- Displacement: 1,610 t (1,580 long tons) surfaced; 1,799 t (1,771 long tons) submerged
- Length: 87.58 m (287 ft 4 in) o/a; 68.50 m (224 ft 9 in) pressure hull
- Beam: 7.50 m (24 ft 7 in) o/a; 4.40 m (14 ft 5 in) pressure hull
- Height: 10.20 m (33 ft 6 in)
- Draught: 5.35 m (17 ft 7 in)
- Installed power: 9,000 PS (6,620 kW; 8,880 bhp) (diesels); 1,000 PS (740 kW; 990 shp) (electric)
- Propulsion: 2 shafts; 2 × diesel engines; 2 × electric motors
- Speed: 20.8 knots (38.5 km/h; 23.9 mph) surfaced; 6.9 knots (12.8 km/h; 7.9 mph) submerged
- Range: 12,750 nmi (23,610 km; 14,670 mi) at 10 knots (19 km/h; 12 mph) surfaced; 57 nmi (106 km; 66 mi) at 4 knots (7.4 km/h; 4.6 mph) submerged
- Test depth: 230 m (750 ft)
- Complement: 66
- Armament: 6 × 53.3 cm (21 in) torpedo tubes (four bow, two stern); 24 × torpedoes or 48 TMA or 72 TMB naval mines; 1 × SK L/45 'Utof' deck gun (150 rounds); 1 × 3.7 cm (1.5 in) SK C/30; 2 × 2 cm (0.79 in) C/30 anti-aircraft guns

Service record
- Part of: 4th U-boat Flotilla; 17 April – 31 October 1943; 12th U-boat Flotilla; 1 November – 20 December 1943
- Identification codes: M 41 858
- Commanders: K.Kapt. / F.Kapt. / Kapt.z.S. Klaus Ewerth; 17 April – 20 December 1943
- Operations: 1 patrol: 18 November – 20 December 1943
- Victories: None

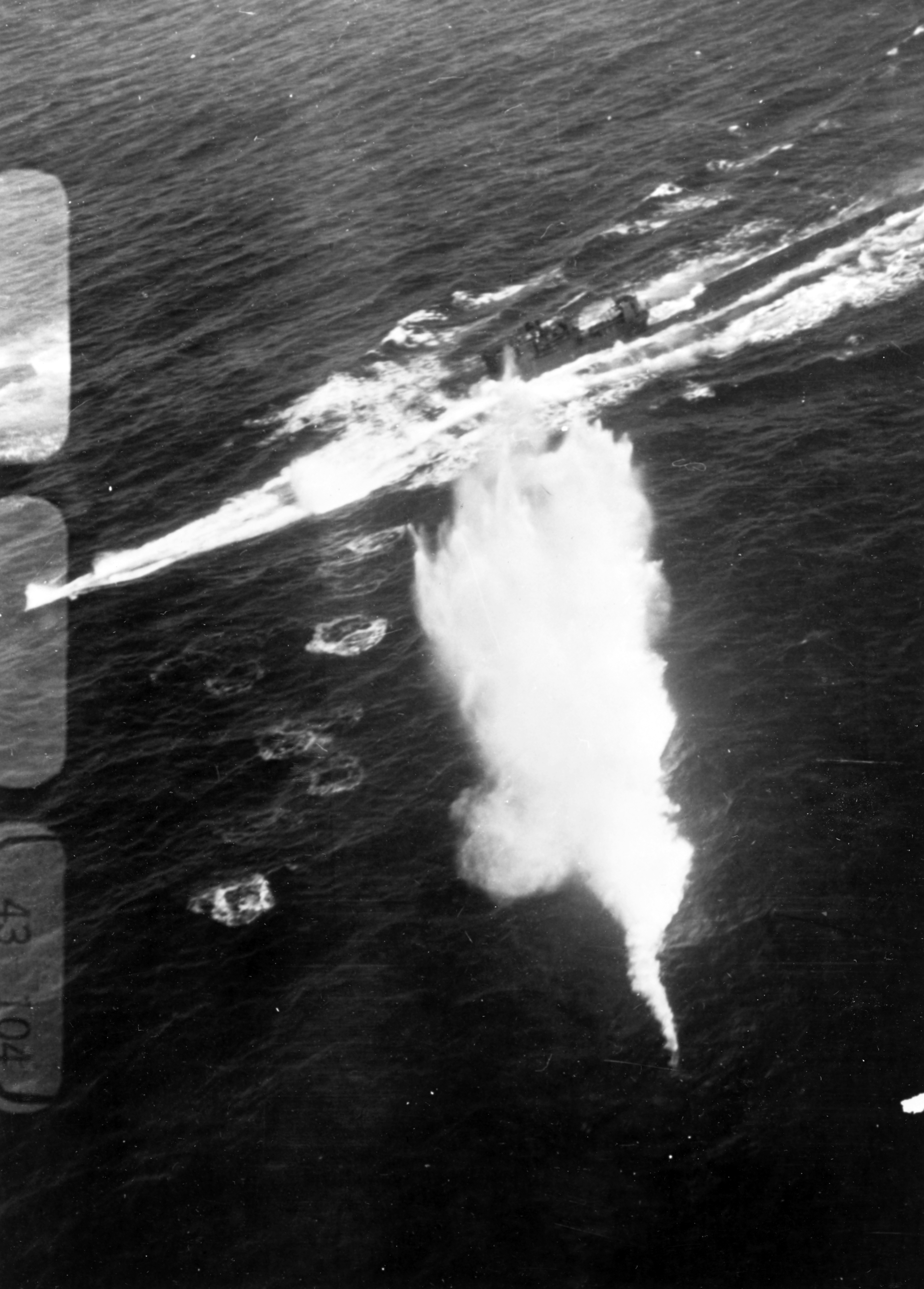
U-850 under attack by the U.S. Navy aircraft

German submarine U-850 was a long-range Type IXD2 U-boat built for Nazi Germany's Kriegsmarine during World War II.

== Design ==
German Type IXD2 submarines were considerably larger than the original Type IXs. U-850 had a displacement of 1,610 tonnes (1,580 long tons) when at the surface and 1,799 tonnes (1,771 long tons) while submerged. The U-boat had a total length of 87.58 m (287 ft 4 in), a pressure hull length of 68.50 m (224 ft 9 in), a beam of 7.50 m (24 ft 7 in), a height of 10.20 m (33 ft 6 in), and a draught of 5.35 m (17 ft 7 in). The submarine was powered by two MAN M 9 V 40/46 supercharged four-stroke, nine-cylinder diesel engines plus two MWM RS34.5S six-cylinder four-stroke diesel engines for cruising, producing a total of 9,000 metric horsepower (6,620 kW; 8,880 shp) for use while surfaced, two Siemens-Schuckert 2 GU 345/34 double-acting electric motors producing a total of 1,000 shaft horsepower (1,010 PS; 750 kW) for use while submerged. She had two shafts and two 1.85 m (6 ft) propellers. The boat was capable of operating at depths of up to 200 metres (660 ft).

The submarine had a maximum surface speed of 20.8 knots (38.5 km/h; 23.9 mph) and a maximum submerged speed of 6.9 knots (12.8 km/h; 7.9 mph). When submerged, the boat could operate for 121 nautical miles (224 km; 139 mi) at 2 knots (3.7 km/h; 2.3 mph); when surfaced, she could travel 12,750 nautical miles (23,610 km; 14,670 mi) at 10 knots (19 km/h; 12 mph). U-850 was fitted with six 53.3 cm (21 in) torpedo tubes (four fitted at the bow and two at the stern), 24 torpedoes, one 10.5 cm (4.13 in) SK C/32 naval gun, 150 rounds, and a 3.7 cm (1.5 in) SK C/30 with 2575 rounds as well as two 2 cm (0.79 in) C/30 anti-aircraft guns with 8100 rounds. The boat had a complement of fifty-five.

== Service history ==
The U-boat was ordered on 20 January 1941 and laid down at the DESCHIMAG AG Weser shipyard on 17 March 1942. Assigned yard number 1056, she was launched on 7 December of that year. Commissioned on 17 April 1943 under the command of Korvettenkapitän Klaus Ewerth (Crew 25), who had previously commanded U-26. U-850 served with the 4th U-boat Flotilla until the end of October when she transferred to the 12th U-boat Flotilla for front-line service. U-850 left Kiel on 18 November 1943 destined for the Indian Ocean in order to join Monsoon Group, she was, however, spotted and successfully attacked by US aircraft from USS Bogue west of Madeira on 20 December.

== Fate ==
On 20 December 1943, while en route to the Indian Ocean, U-850 was spotted by aircraft of Squadron VC-19 from USS Bogue. The first aircraft, an Grumman TBF Avenger piloted by Lieutenant W. A. La Fleur, attacked the U-boat with depth charges which missed their target. After La Fleur reported the sighting via radio, two Grumman F4F Wildcats accompanied by two more Avengers – T18 and T19 – arrived on the scene. While the Wildcats strafed U-850, T19, piloted by Ensign G. C. Goodwin, made another attack with depth charges which hit their target. The U-boat tried to evade by crash diving, but T18, piloted by Lieutenant H. G. Bradshaw, dropped two FIDO torpedoes, which both hit the U-boat on the starboard side. USS George E. Badger and Du Pont later recovered some bodies, body parts, and pieces of wreckage. There were no survivors.

== Successes ==
U-850 did not sink or damage any ships while in service.

== Bibliography ==
- Busch, Rainer; Röll, Hans-Joachim (1997). Der U-Boot-Krieg, 1939-1945: Die deutschen U-Boot-Kommandanten (in German). Vol. II. Hamburg, Berlin, Bonn: Mittler. ISBN 3-8132-0509-6.
- Busch, Rainer; Röll, Hans-Joachim (1999). German U-boat commanders of World War II: a biographical dictionary. Translated by Brooks, Geoffrey. London, Annapolis, Md: Greenhill Books, Naval Institute Press. ISBN 1-55750-186-6.
- Busch, Rainer; Röll, Hans-Joachim (1999). Der U-Boot-Krieg, 1939-1945: Deutsche U-Boot-Verluste von September 1939 bis Mai 1945 [German U-boat losses from September 1939 to May 1945] (in German). Vol. IV. Hamburg, Berlin, Bonn: Mittler. ISBN 3-8132-0514-2.
- Gröner, Eric; Jung, Dieter; Maass, Martin (1991). German Warships 1815-1945: U-boats and Mine Warfare Vessels. Vol. 2. Translated by Thomas, Keith; Magowan, Rachel. London: Conway Maritime Press. ISBN 0-85177-593-4.
- Der U-Boot-Krieg, 1939-1945: Die deutschen U-Boot-Kommandanten
- Sharpe, Peter (1998). U-Boat Fact File. Great Britain: Midland Publishing. ISBN 1-85780-072-9.
