= AP convoys =

1942–1945 series of troop convoys from Aden to Bandar Abbas

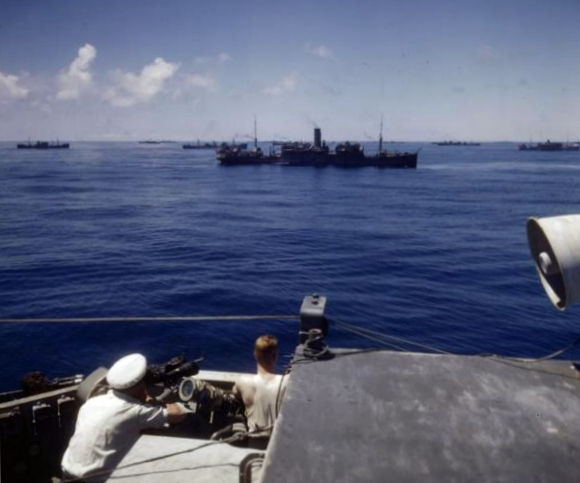
- View of a convoy during the Second World War.
- Type: AP Convoys
- Location: Arabian Sea
- Planned: 92
- Objective: Merchant convoys between Aden, Colony of Aden, and Bandar Abbas, Persia
- Date: September 1942 to January 1945

Ports of call for AP convoys

The AP convoys were a series of Arabian Sea convoys which ran during World War II.

They take their name from the route: Aden and Bandar Abbas, Persia

== Overview ==
The AP series was the reverse of PA series that ran from September 1942 until January 1945. There were 92 AP convoys, comprising 615 individual ship listings and 215 escorts. Some of the ships listed in a convoy did not always make the complete trip between Aden and Bandar Abbas though, while some continued on to Abadan.

In 1940, there had been five other convoys labeled AP, these are separate from the 1942–1945 series.

== Convoy List ==
=== 1942 ===
Convoy	Departure Date	Arrival Date	No.of Merchant Ships	Notes
AP 1	10 September 1942	16 September 1942	3	
AP 2	15 September 1942	24 September 1942	2	
AP 3	29 September 1942	6 October 1942	10	3 escorts
AP 3A	7 October 1942	Not listed	3	2 escorts
AP 3B	13 October 1942	20 October 1942	6	2 escorts
AP 4	25 October 1942	Not listed	5	4 escorts
AP 5	2 November 1942	9 November 1942	8	1 escort
AP 6	11 November 1942	18 November 1942	5	1 escort
AP 7	20 November 1942	27 November 1942	3	1 escort
AP 8	26 November 1942	Not listed	3	
AP 9	10 December 1942	17 December 1942	1	1 escort
AP 10	21 December 1942	28 December 1942	5	
AP 11	26 December 1942	1 January 1943	4	1 escort

=== 1943 ===
Convoy	Departure Date	Arrival Date	No.of Merchant Ships	Notes
AP 12	8 January 1943	14 January 1943	3	1 escort
AP 13	14 January 1943	20 January 1943	2	1 escort
AP 14	22 January 1943	28 January 1943	9	2 escorts
AP 15	24 January 1943	Not listed	1	2 escorts
AP 16	27 January 1943	Not listed	2	1 escort
AP 17	3 February 1943	11 February 1943	3	1 escort
AP 18	8 February 1943	15 February 1943	4	3 escorts
AP 19	14 February 1943	21 February 1943	5	
AP 20	22 February 1943	1 March 1943	2	1 escort
AP 21	25 February 1943	4 March 1943	2	
AP 22	1 March 1943	10 March 1943	4	1 escort
AP 23	8 March 1943	15 March 1943	5	1 escort
AP 24	13 March 1943	19 March 1943	4	1 escort
AP 25	19 March 1943	Not listed	3	1 escort
AP 26	26 March 1943	2 April 1943	5	1 escort
AP 27	2 April 1943	8 April 1943	4	1 escort
AP 28	11 April 1943	18 April 1943	6	1 escort
AP 29	17 April 1943	Not listed	3	1 escort
AP 30	13 May 1943	19 May 1943	3	1 escort
AP 31	18 May 1943	25 May 1943	2	1 escort
AP 31A	23 May 1943	Not listed	0	1 escort
AP 32	2 June 1943	8 June 1943	3	1 escort
AP 33	13 June 1943	19 June 1943	5	2 escorts
AP 34	21 June 1943	28 June 1943	18	2 escorts
AP 35	18 June 1943	Not listed	1	1 escort
AP 35A	7 July 1943	13 July 1943	6	2 escorts
AP 36	14 July 1943	20 July 1943	2	1 escort
AP 37	21 July 1943	26 July 1943	4	2 escorts
AP 38	31 July 1943	5 August 1943	2	2 escorts
AP 39	8 August 1943	Not listed	4	2 escorts
AP 40	15 August 1943	22 August 1943	4	1 escort
AP 41	17 August 1943	23 August 1943	9	1 escort
AP 42	22 August 1943	Not listed	6	2 escorts
AP 43	31 August 1943	6 September 1943	13	2 escorts
AP 44	8 September 1943	14 September 1943	6	1 escort
AP 45	15 September 1943	21 September 1943	3	2 escorts
AP 46	24 September 1943	30 September 1943	7	2 escorts
AP 47	3 October 1943	Not listed	9	2 escorts
AP 48	9 October 1943	16 October 1943	7	3 escorts
AP 49	18 October 1943	25 October 1943	13	2 escorts
AP 50	25 October 1943	3 November 1943	15	3 escorts
AP 51	2 November 1943	10 November 1943	17	2 escorts
AP 52	10 November 1943	17 November 1943	21	2 escorts
AP 53	19 November 1943	26 November 1943	18	2 escorts
AP 54	26 November 1943	3 December 1943	5	2 escorts
AP 55	6 December 1943	14 December 1943	16	3 escorts
AP 56	13 December 1943	20 December 1943	20	3 escorts

=== 1944 ===
Convoy	Departure Date	Arrival Date	No.of Merchant Ships	Notes
AP 57	5 January 1944	12 January 1944	6	2 escorts
AP 58	13 January 1944	20 January 1944	20	2 escorts
AP 59	30 January 1944	6 February 1944	2	2 escorts
AP 60	7 February 1944	14 February 1944	11	3 escorts
AP 61	15 February 1944	23 February 1944	5	1 escort
AP 62	24 February 1944	3 March 1944	12	2 escorts
AP 63	2 March 1944	10 March 1944	17	3 escorts
AP 64	10 March 1944	17 March 1944	12	3 escorts
AP 65	20 March 1944	27 March 1944	12	2 escorts
AP 66	29 March 1944	5 April 1944	8	4 escorts
AP 67	4 April 1944	10 April 1944	2	2 escorts
AP 68	11 April 1944	18 April 1944	14	2 escorts
AP 69	20 April 1944	26 April 1944	15	2 escorts
AP 70	5 May 1944	11 May 1944	2	1 escort
AP 71	28 May 1944	3 June 1944	2	1 escort
AP 72	16 June 1944	23 June 1944	23	5 escorts
AP 73	26 June 1944	3 July 1944	29	4 escorts
AP 73A	14 July 1944	19 July 1944	1	2 escorts
AP 73B	5 August 1944	11 August 1944	1	2 escorts
AP 73C	14 August 1944	20 August 1944	1	1 escort
AP 74	8 September 1944	14 September 1944	14	2 escorts
AP 74A	16 September 1944	22 September 1944	1	2 escorts
AP 74B	10 December 1944	16 December 1944	0	1 escort
AP 75	8 November 1944	14 November 1944	2	2 escorts
AP 75A	13 December 1944	17 December 1944	1	1 escort

=== 1945 ===
Convoy	Departure Date	Arrival Date	No.of Merchant Ships	Notes
AP 75B	5 January 1945	10 January 1945	1	1 escort
AP 75C	26 January 1945	1 February 1945	1	1 escort

== Other AP convoys List ==
=== 1940 ===
In September 1940, there were a series of convoys starting in Liverpool, and traveling to Suez, via Cape Town, and Aden, labeled AP.

Convoy	Departure Date	Arrival Date	No.of Merchant Ships	Notes
AP 1	22 August 1940	23 September 1940	3	6 escorts
AP 2	22 August 1942	26 September 1942	2	5 escorts
AP 3	10 September 1942	22 October 1942	10	17 escorts
AP 3A	11 October 1942	26 October 1940	1	5 escorts, originated in Durban

In April 1940, one convoy, starting in Leith, travelling to Norway, was labeled AP. It lost one ship, Cedarbank, to U-26, on 21 April 1940.

Convoy	Departure Date	Arrival Date	No.of Merchant Ships	Notes
AP 1	22 August 1940	23 September 1940	3	6 escorts, 1 ship lost

== Notes ==
Citations

== Bibliography ==
Books

- Arnold Hague (2000). The Allied Convoy System 1939–1945. ISBN 1-86176-147-3.
- Rohwer, J. & Hummelchen, G. (1992). Chronology of the War at Sea 1939–1945. Naval Institute Press. ISBN 1-55750-105-X.
- Silverstone, Paul H. (1968). U.S. Warships of World War II. Doubleday and Company.

Online resources

- "AP Convoy Series". Convoy Web - Arnold Hague Convoy Database. Archived from the original on 30 March 2013.
