= Klaus Ewerth =

- Klaus Ewerth
- Born: 28 March 1907; Angerburg, East Prussia (now Węgorzewo, Poland)
- Died: 20 December 1943 (aged 36) Atlantic Ocean
- Allegiance: Weimar Republic (to 1933); Nazi Germany
- Branch: Reichsmarine; Kriegsmarine
- Service years: 1925–43
- Rank: Kapitän zur See
- Commands: U-1; U-35; U-36; U-26; U-850
- Conflicts: World War II: Battle of the Atlantic
- Awards: Spanish Cross in Silver with Swords, U-boat War Badge, Iron Cross 2nd Class, War Merit Cross 1st Class with Swords

Klaus Ewerth (28 March 1907 – 20 December 1943) was a German U-boat commander in World War II. He reached the rank of Kapitän zur See with the Kriegsmarine during World War II.

== Career ==
Klaus Ewerth joined the Reichsmarine in 1925. He commissioned the first German U-boat since World War I, the small Type IIA U-1 on 29 June 1935. He left the U-1 on 30 September 1936 to prepare for his next command. Klaus Ewerth commissioned the new Type VIIA U-35 on 3 November 1936. He commanded the boat until 5 December 1936. He then commissioned the new U-36 on 16 December 1936. He would command the boat for almost 2 years, until 31 October 1938. From November 1938 to August 1939, Ewerth served as an instructor at the Naval Academy Mürwik.

Ewerth then commanded the U-26 from 1 August 1939 to 3 January 1940. He went out on two patrols with the boat, spending 74 days at sea. He sank 4 ships during these patrols, 3 of them were lost to mines laid by U-26. From January 1940 to February 1943 Ewerth served in several staff positions with the U-Boat Command before being assigned to U-boat familiarization in preparation for his command of a new U-boat from March to April 1943.

== Death ==
On 17 April 1943, Ewerth commissioned the huge new Type IXD boat U-850. After almost seven months in training and preparation, Ewerth took the boat from Kiel heading in to the South Atlantic as part of the Monsun Gruppe. On 20 December 1943, 33 days in to its first patrol, the boat was sunk with the loss of all 66 hands in the mid-Atlantic west of Madeira. It was attacked by a group of Grumman Avenger and Grumman Wildcat aircraft from the American escort carrier USS Bogue, and sunk after being attacked using a combination of depth charges and Fido homing torpedoes.

== Summary of career ==
=== Ships attacked ===
Date	Ship	Nationality	Tonnage	Fate
15 September 1939	Alex van Opstal	Belgium	5,965	Sunk
7 October 1939	SS Binnendijk	Netherlands	6,873	Sunk
13 November 1939	Loire	France	4,285	Sunk
22 November 1939	Elena R.	Greece	4,576	Sunk

=== Awards ===
- Spanish Cross in Silver with Swords
- U-boat War Badge
- Iron Cross 2nd Class
- War Merit Cross 1st Class with Swords

== Bibliography ==
- Busch, Rainer; Röll, Hans-Joachim (1999). German U-boat commanders of World War II : a biographical dictionary. Translated by Brooks, Geoffrey. London, Annapolis, Md: Greenhill Books, Naval Institute Press. ISBN 1-55750-186-6.

Military offices
First	Commanding officer, U-1; 29 June 1935 – 30 September 1936	Succeeded by Kapitänleutnant Alexander Gelhaar
First	Commanding officer, U-36; 16 December 1936 – 31 October 1938	Succeeded by Kapitänleutnant Wilhelm Fröhlich
Preceded by Kapitänleutnant Oskar Schomberg	Commanding officer, U-26; 28 August 1938 – 3 January 1940	Succeeded by Kapitänleutnant Heinz Scheringer
First	Commanding officer, U-850; 17 April 1943 – 20 December 1943	Ship sunk
