= SS Beemsterdijk =

Dutch cargo steamship sunk by an Allied mine in the Irish sea in 1941

- Beemsterdijk, probably in the Scheldt

History

Netherlands
- Name: Beemsterdijk
- Owner: NASM
- Operator: Holland America Line
- Port of registry: Rotterdam
- Builder: S&W Fijenoord, Rotterdam
- Yard number: 290
- Launched: 25 January 1922
- Completed: 15 June 1922
- Maiden voyage: 31 January 1923
- Identification: until 1933: code letters NGTC; by 1934: call sign PCZP
- Fate: mined, 26 January 1941

General characteristics
- Class & type: NASM B-class cargo ship
- Tonnage: 6,869 GRT, 4,241 NRT, 9,852 DWT
- Length: 400.6 ft (122.1 m)
- Beam: 54.3 ft (16.6 m)
- Draught: 30 ft 2 in (9.19 m)
- Depth: 36.6 ft (11.2 m)
- Decks: 2 + shelter deck
- Installed power: 2 × steam turbines; 648 NHP; 3,000 SHP
- Propulsion: double-reduction gearing; 1 × screw
- Speed: 12 1/2 knots (23 km/h)
- Capacity: cargo: 527,000 cu ft (14,900 m^{3}) grain; 478,000 cu ft (13,500 m^{3}) bale; passengers: as built: 3 × 1st class; 1934: 7
- Crew: 42
- Sensors & processing systems: wireless direction finding (by 1937)
- Armament: DEMS (by 1941)
- Notes: one of a class of eight sister ships

SS Beemsterdijk was a Holland America Line (NASM) cargo steamship. She was one of NASM's B-class ships: the company's first cargo ships to be powered by steam turbines. She was built in Rotterdam in 1922.

A mine sank the ship in the Irish Sea in 1941, with the loss of 39 of her 42 crew. Her survivors drifted in a life raft for four days, until an RNLI lifeboat rescued them off the coast of Ireland.

Some sources anglicise the ship's name to Beemsterdyk. However, Lloyd's Register always recorded her as Beemsterdijk.

== B-class turbine steamships ==
Until 1920, every NASM cargo ship was propelled by a reciprocating steam engine; in most cases triple-expansion. However, in April of that year C. van der Giessen & Zonen's shipyard in Krimpen aan den IJssel laid down the first of a class of new ships of about 6,850 GRT for NASM. Each member of the class was to be driven by two Brown-Curtis steam turbines, driving a single screw via double-reduction gearing.

Van der Giessen launched the first ship in October 1920 as Burgerdijk, completed her in June 1921, and went on to build three more members of the class. Industrieële Maatschappij 'De Noord' in Alblasserdam built two, including the final member of the class, Boschdijk, which was completed in October 1922. Boele's Scheepswerven & Machinefabriek in Bolnes in South Holland built one, and Maatschappij voor Scheeps- en Werktuigbouw Fijenoord in Rotterdam built one.

== Building Beemsterdijk ==
Scheeps- en Werktuigbouw Fijenoord built Beemsterdijk as yard number 290. She was the sixth member of the class to be completed. She was yard number 290. She was launched on 29 January 1922 and completed on 15 June.

Her lengths were 416.3 ft (126.9 m) overall and 400.6 ft (122.1 m) registered. Her beam was 54.3 ft (16.6 m) and her depth was 36.6 ft (11.2 m). Her tonnages were 6,869 GRT, 4,241 NRT and 9,852 DWT. She had six holds, divided by watertight bulkheads. They gave her a capacity for 527,000 cubic feet (14,900 m^{3}) of grain, or 478,000 cubic feet (13,500 m^{3}) of baled cargo. She also had three berths for first class passengers.

The combined power output of Beemsterdijk's turbines was rated at 648 NHP or 3,000 SHP. They gave her a speed of 12 1/2 knots (23 km/h).

== Peacetime career ==
NASM registered Beemsterdijk at Rotterdam. Her code letters were NGTC. On 31 January 1923 she left Rotteredam on her maiden voyage, which was to NASM's terminal in Hoboken, New Jersey.

By 1934 the wireless telegraph call sign PCZB had supreseded Beemsterdijk's code letters. Also in 1934, her accommodation was increased to carry seven passengers. By 1937 she was equipped with wireless direction finding.

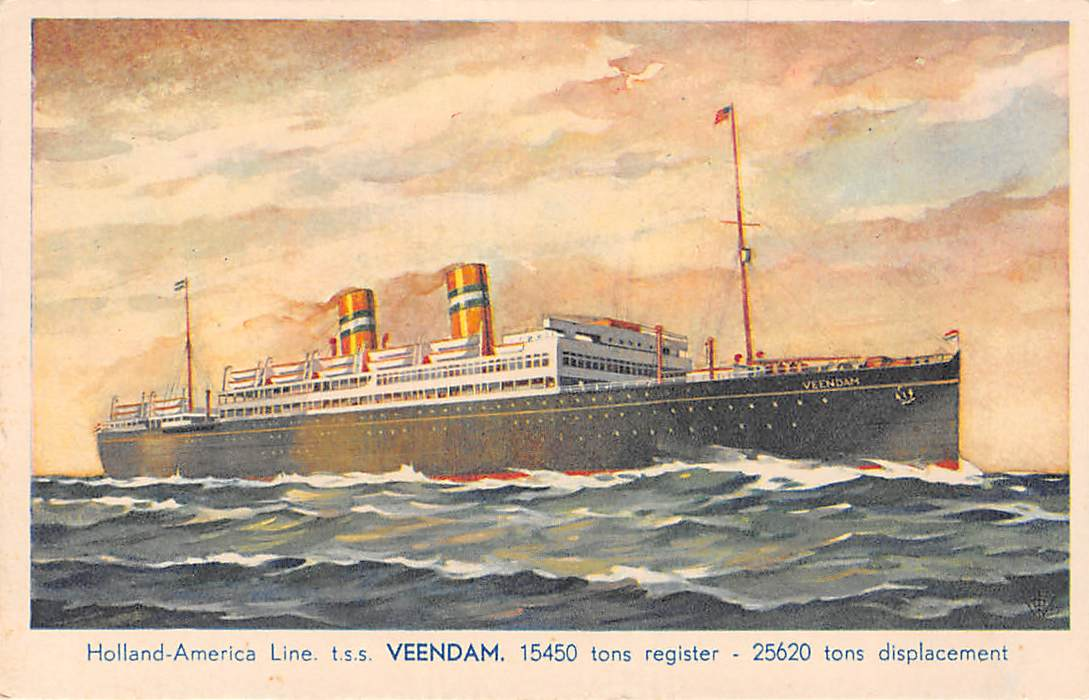
The transatlantic liner Veendam

On 3 April 1936, three teenage boys from Kips Bay, Manhattan, stowed away on the NASM transatlantic liner Veendam, in the mistaken belief that she was going to Brazil. They were discovered the next day, and NASM at first said that the boys would be landed at Plymouth, England, where the US Consul would arrange their return. Veendam's Master made them do three hours' work a day until 6 April, when Veendam met Beemsterdijk in mid-Atlantic. Beemsterdijk was westbound to Hoboken, so the three stowaways were transferred by motor launch from Veendam to the cargo ship. Beemsterdijk landed the boys back at Hoboken on 10 April.

== Wartime career ==
Beemsterdijk was in the Gulf of Mexico when Germany invaded the Netherlands. She left Galveston on 4 May 1940, and was in New Orleans from 4 to 11 May. Her movements for the next few weeks are not clear, but on 27 June she left New Orleans carrying general cargo and sailed via Bermuda, where she joined Convoy BKX 56. This converged with Convoy HX 56 from Kalifax, Nova Scotia, by which she reached Liverpool on 22 or 23 July.

On 22 August 1940 Beemsterdijk left Liverpool with Convoy OB 202, which dispersed at sea. She continued unescorted to New York, where she was in port from 5 to 13 September, and loaded a cargo of steel. She sailed unescorted to Halifax, where she joined Convoy HX 74, by which she reached Liverpool on 2 October.

On 9 November 1940 Beemsterdijk left Liverpool with Convoy OB 241, which dispersed at sea. She continued unescorted to Baltimore, where she was in port from 26 November to 5 December. She sailed unescorted to Halifax, where she joined Convoy HX 95. Before the convoy reached Liverpool, Beemsterdijk detached for the Firth of Clyde, where she arrived on 26 December.

== Loss ==
On 21 January 1941 Beemsterdijk left Glasgow in ballast to bunker at Cardiff. On 24 January she called at Greenock for her compass to be adjusted. However, the ship had new degaussing equipment, which may have interfered with her compass.

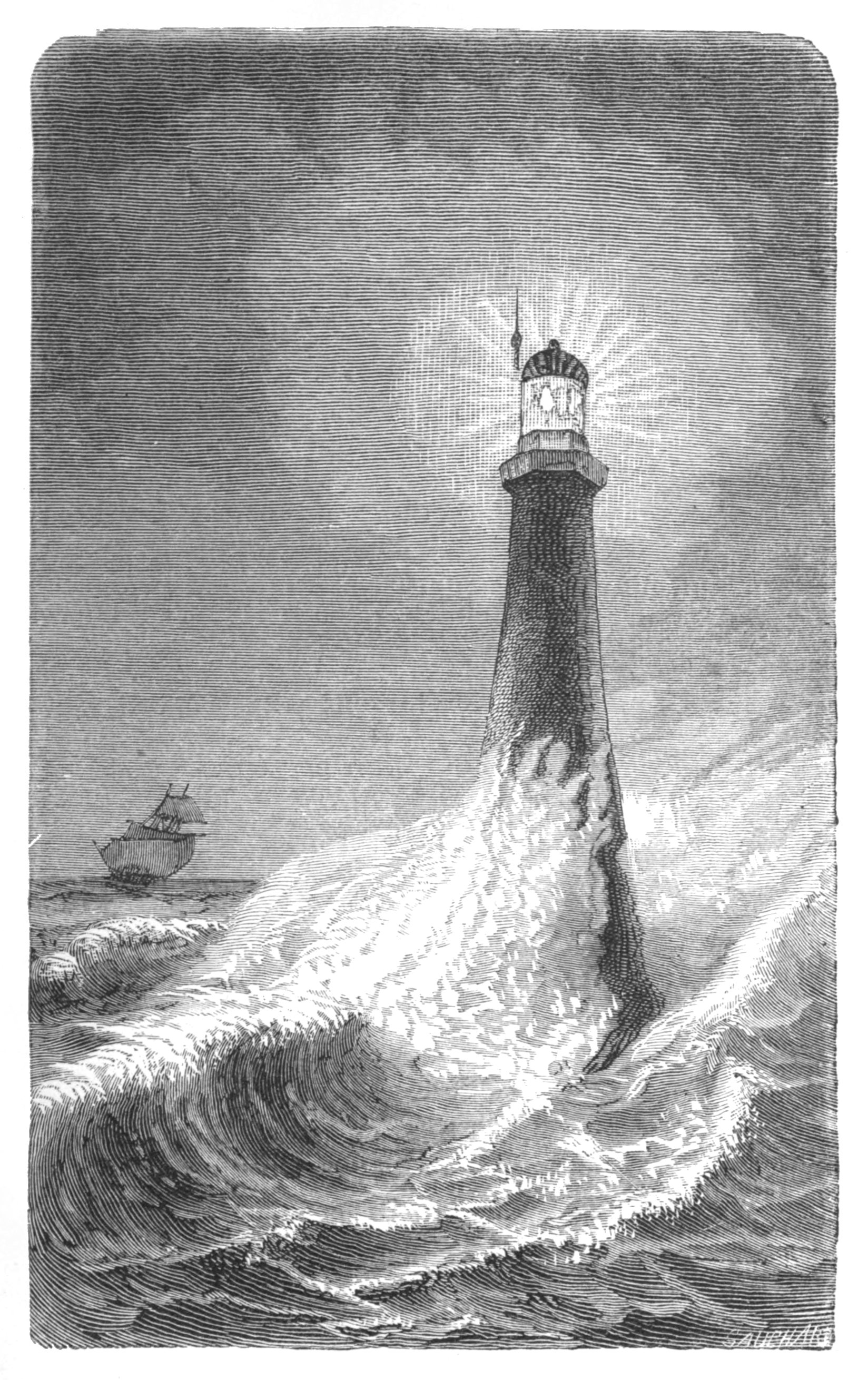
An engraving of the Smalls Lighthouse in a storm

On the morning of 26 January she was in St George's Channel off the west coast of Pembrokeshire, at a position that her navigators believed to be about 12 nautical miles (22 km) off the Smalls Lighthouse, when she struck an Allied mine that blew a hole in her hull in way of holds 5 and 6 aft. At 11:20 hrs the wireless telegraph (radio) officer transmitted the first SOS signal. The Fourth Engineer stopped her engines, the crew launched her lifeboats, and the entire ship's company abandoned ship in ten minutes.

Beemsterdijk settled in the water, but maintained an even keel and did not sink. About an hour later her Master, Captain Dirk Wijers, reboarded her with the Chief Engineer and the Fourth Engineer. The water level inside the ship was slowly rising. The rest of the crew reboarded the ship to try to save her, and dropped one of her anchors to keep her position. All remained on deck, and all except Captain Wijers kept their lifejackets on. The radio operator, Quirinus Kroeze, transmitted four SOS signals in less than two and a half hours.

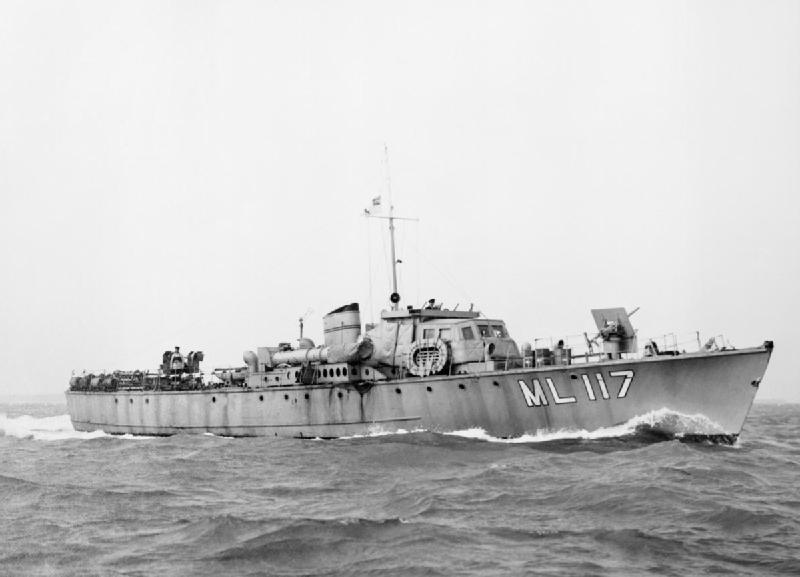
A Royal Navy Fairmile B motor launch, similar to ML 168

At 11:30 hrs on 26 January, the RNLI St Davids Lifeboat Station launched its lifeboat Swn-y-Mor. At 15:15 hrs she reached the position Beemsterdijk had given, and was soon joined by three other vessels, and made contact with one of them, the Royal Navy Fairmile B motor launch ML 168. They failed to find Beemsterdijk, and at 15:55 hrs Swn-y-Mor was recalled to St David's.

The Royal Navy base at Milford Haven sent two Dutch tugs: Goliath at 11:50 hrs, and L Smit & Co's Seine shortly after. At 15:15 hrs they reached the position Beemsterdijk had given, but visibility was poor, and they did not find her. A British naval trawler gave the tugs directions to Beemsterdijk's position, but they still did not find her. The tugs, the Smalls Lighthouse, and the radio station at Land's End maintained radio contact. At 21:30 hrs Beemsterdijk radioed that she would fire a flare rocket. The tugs failed to see it, so the ship fired a second flare. The tugs failed to see the second flare, too. On the morning of 27 January the wind increased to a gale. At 09:00 hrs Seine broke off the search, and at 12:30 hrs Goliath did likewise and returned to Milford Haven.

The Saint-class tug Caroline Moller (formerly HMS St Mabyn) and three launches were sent from Falmouth, Cornwall. Then all encountered poor visibility and also failed to find Beemsterdijk.

As the wind increased on the morning of 27 January, the bulkhead between Beemsterdijk's holds 5 and 6 collapsed under the weight of water at about 09:30 hrs. Captain Wijers immediately ordered the crew back into the lifeboats. Before the men reached the boats, the ship rapidly listed to starboard and sank stern first at position 51°17′00″N 6°23′00″W , sinking the lifeboats with her. The crew was thrown into the water.

== Rescue ==
The Fourth Engineer, steward, boatswain's boy and a galley boy found and boarded a life raft that had floated free from the ship. The raft had no food, drinking water, oars, or emergency signalling equipment. At times it drifted close to being dashed on rocks, so the men removed two boards from the deck, which they used to paddle to safety. On 28 January all four men were washed overboard, but managed to reboard the raft. On 29 January the galley boy, Cornelis Lenaerst, was washed overboard again, and lost.

The raft had drifted west, and was now off the south coast of Ireland. On 30 January, Irish Coast Guards at Look Out Post 17 on Brownstown Head in County Waterford sighted the raft and alerted the RNLI station at Dunmore East. The lifeboat Annie Blanche Smith was launched at 10:20 hrs. 15 minutes later it reached the raft, which by then was in Coolum Cove, within 300 yards (270 m) of rocks. The three survivors were weakened by cold, wet, hunger, and lack of water for four days. The bow-man of the lifeboat jumped onto the raft, at great personal risk, to help them to board the lifeboat.

At 13:30 hrs Annie Blanche Smith arrived back at Dunmore East. A local hotel accommodated the three men, and a doctor from Waterford and members of the Irish Red Cross Society looked after them. About 19 February were moved to Waterford. The Missions to Seamen accommodated Fourth Engineer Willem van't Hoff and boatswain's boy Stanley Gillard. Steward Petrus Schrage was admitted to Waterford Infirmary for treatment to his foot.

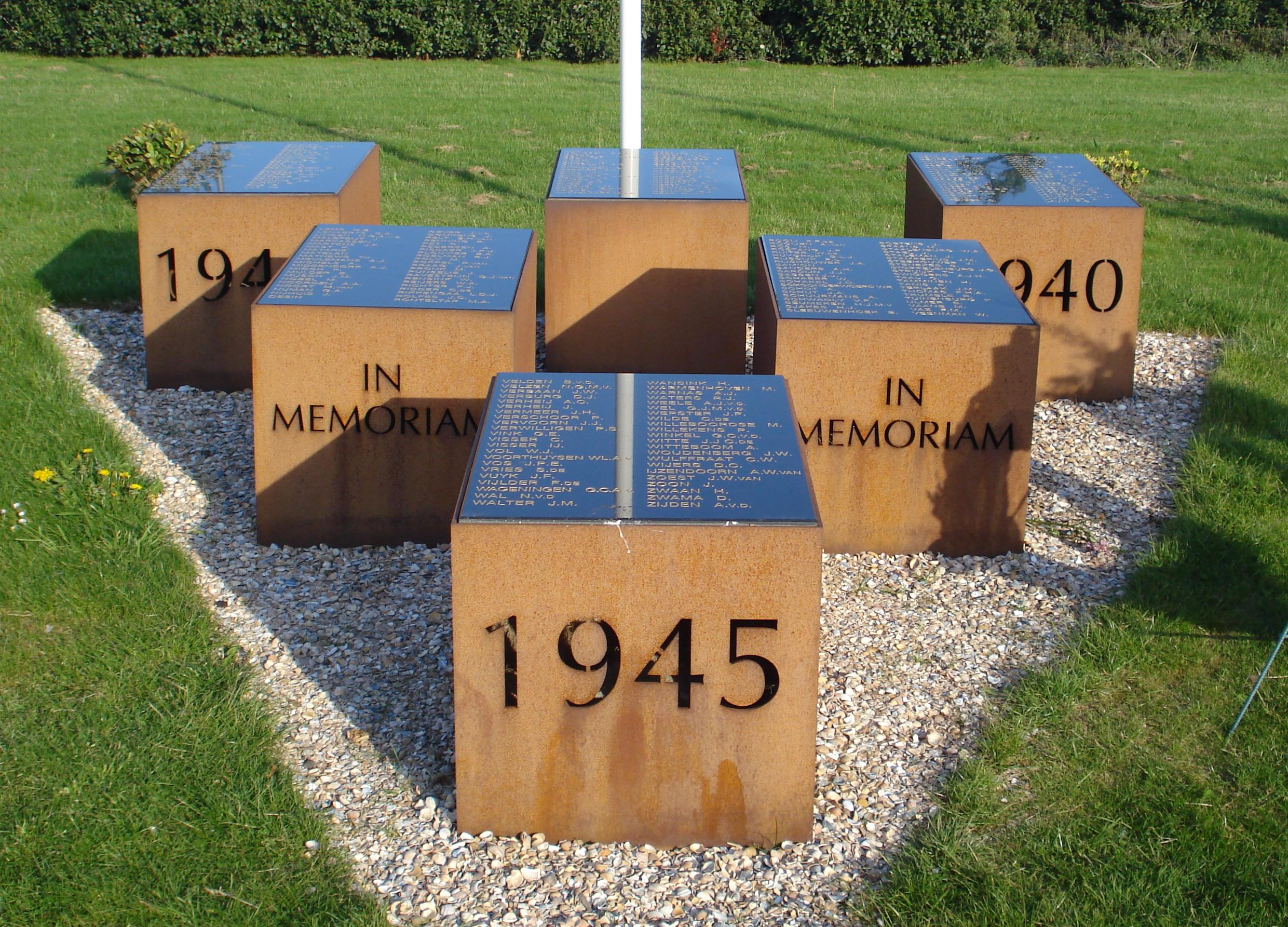
NASM's Second World War memorial in Katendrecht, Rotterdam

Of the 39 men lost, four bodies washed ashore in Pembrokeshire. Third Officer Willem Reijers, assistant engineer Paulus Tanis, and oiler Jan Witte were later reburied in the Dutch war graves section of Mill Hill Cemetery in North London. Purser Willem van der Hoeven remains buried at St Davids in Pembrokeshire.

== See also ==
- Binnendijk – a sister ship of Beemsterdijk, sunk by a mine in 1939

== Bibliography ==
- Haws, Duncan (1995). Holland America Line. Merchant Fleets series. Vol. 28. Uckfield: Travel Creatours Ltd Publications. ISBN 0946378258.
- Lloyd's Register of Shipping. Vol. II.–Steamers and Motor Vessels. London: Lloyd's Register of Shipping. 1923 – via Internet Archive.
- Lloyd's Register of Shipping (PDF). Vol. II.–Steamers and Motorships of 300 Tons Gross and Over. London: Lloyd's Register of Shipping. 1934 – via Southampton City Council.
- Lloyd's Register of Shipping (PDF). Vol. II.–Steamers and Motorships of 300 Tons Gross and Over. London: Lloyd's Register of Shipping. 1937 – via Southampton City Council.
