= TMB =

TMB may refer to:

== Organizations ==
- Tamilnad Mercantile Bank Limited, India
- Texas Medical Board
- Thai Military Bank
- Transports Metropolitans de Barcelona, Spain

== Places ==
- Kendall-Tamiami Executive Airport near Miami, Florida, US, IATA code
- Tsing Ma Bridge, a longest span suspension bridge in Hong Kong
- Two-Mile Borris, a village in County Tipperary, Ireland

== Events ==
- Tour du Mont Blanc, a walk

== Science and technology ==
- Trimethylborane
- Tumor mutational burden
- 3,3',5,5'-Tetramethylbenzidine, a chemical stain.
- TMB and TMSB series mines (Soviet)
- TMB (German mine)

== Arts ==
- The Spirit of Troy, the University of Southern California Trojan Marching Band
- The Midnight Beast, a British comedy music group

== Other uses ==
- The Third Millennium Bible, a minor update to the King James Version
