= Type I submarine =

Class of German U-boat

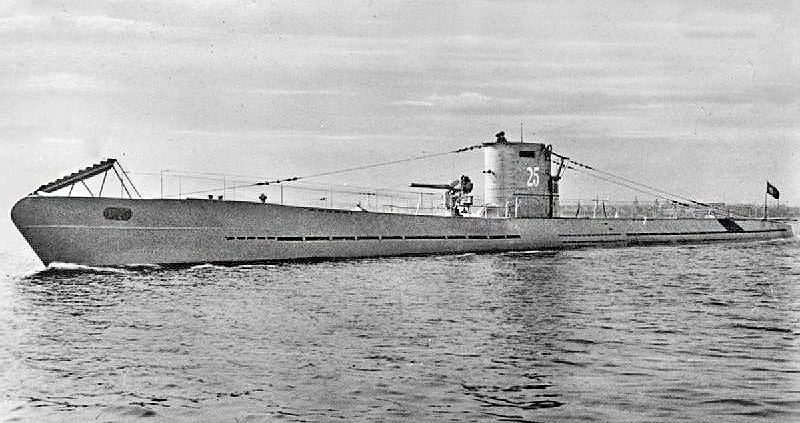
- U-25, a Type I U-boat.

Class overview
- Builders: Deschimag, Bremen
- Operators: Kriegsmarine
- Preceded by: Spanish Type E1
- Succeeded by: Type VII (patrol submarine); Type IX (oceanic submarine)
- Cost: 4,500,000 ℛ︁ℳ︁
- In commission: 1936 – 1940
- Planned: 2
- Completed: 2
- Lost: 2

General characteristics
- Displacement: 862 t (848 long tons) surfaced; 982 t (966 long tons) submerged; Official displacement was 712 tons standard
- Length: 72.39 m (237 ft 6 in)
- Beam: 6.21 m (20 ft 4 in)
- Draft: 4.30 m (14 ft 1 in)
- Propulsion: Diesel-electric: 2 × MAN M 8 V 40/46 8-cylinder diesel engines with 2,900–3,080 PS (2,860–3,040 shp; 2,130–2,270 kW); 2 × BBC GG UB 720/8 double acting electric motors with 1,000 PS (990 shp; 740 kW)
- Speed: 17.7–18.6 knots (32.8–34.4 km/h; 20.4–21.4 mph) surfaced; 8.3 knots (15.4 km/h; 9.6 mph) submerged
- Range: 7,900 nmi (14,600 km; 9,100 mi) at 10 knots (19 km/h; 12 mph) surfaced; 78 nmi (144 km; 90 mi) at 4 knots (7.4 km/h; 4.6 mph) submerged
- Test depth: 200 m (660 ft)
- Complement: 4 officers, 39 enlisted
- Armament: 6 × torpedo tubes (four bow, two stern); 14 × 53.3 cm (21 in) torpedoes; 1 × 10.5 cm (4.1 in) SK C/32 naval gun (180 rounds); anti-aircraft guns

The Type I U-boat was the first post–World War I attempt to produce an oceangoing submarine for Nazi Germany's Kriegsmarine. The type was based on the Spanish Type E-1 and Finnish CV707, which were both designed by Ingenieurskantoor voor Scheepsbouw. Only two Type IAs were built. They were not a successful design : due to its single rudder they had a large turning circle and were not very manoeuvrable. The gravity center of the U-boat was too forward so on the surface the type I had its propellers exposed when she was pitching. Whilst submerged there were problems with depth keeping and stability as air bubbles in the fuel tanks wobbled back and forth. Diving was very slow: at full speed and with six tons of negative buoyancy it took forty seconds to reach ten metres depth. As a result, the type was discontinued and the new type IX class of ocean-going U-boats was designed.

== Service history ==
Constructed by Deschimag in Bremen, the first Type IA was launched on 14 February 1936. The two boats produced, U-25 and U-26, were primarily used as training vessels and for propaganda purposes to fly the Nazi flag. In 1940, the boats were called into combat duty due to the shortage of available submarines. Both boats experienced short, but successful combat careers. U-25 participated in five war cruises, sinking eight enemy ships. On 3 August 1940, while on a mine laying mission near Norway, U-25 struck a mine and sank with all hands on board.

U-26 carried out eight war cruises, sinking three merchant ships on its first mission laying mines. On its second war cruise it became the first U-boat to enter the Mediterranean Sea during World War II. U-26 participated in three other successful war patrols, sinking four additional merchant ships. On its eighth war cruise the boat sank three merchant ships and damaged another ship the next day. The attack on this ship led to severe depth-charging by two British warships, including HMS Gladiolus. Unable to dive, U-26 was forced to surface where she was bombed by a Sunderland flying boat. The crew scuttled the submarine and were rescued by Allied warships.

== List of Type I submarines ==
- German submarine U-25 (1936)
- German submarine U-26 (1936)

== Bibliography ==
- Gröner, Erich; Jung, Dieter; Maass, Martin (1991). German Warships 1815–1945, U-boats and Mine Warfare Vessels. Vol. 2. Translated by Thomas, Keith; Magowan, Rachel. London: Conway Maritime Press. ISBN 0-85177-593-4.
- Paterson, Lawrence (2003). Second U-Boat Flottila. Leo Cooper. ISBN 0-85052-917-4.
- Sharpe, Peter (1998). U-Boat Fact File: Detailed Service Histories of the Submarines Operated by the Kriegsmarine 1935-1945. Leicester: Midland Publishing. ISBN 1-85780-072-9.
- Showell, Jak P. Mallmann (2006). The U-boat Century: German Submarine Warfare 1906-2006. London: Chatham Publishing. ISBN 9781861762412.
- Rössler, Eberhard (2001). The U-boat: The evolution and technical history of German submarines. London: Cassell & Co. ISBN 0-304-36120-8.
- Williamson, Gordon (2005). Wolf Pack: The Story of the U-boat in World War II. Oxford: Osprey Publishing. ISBN 1-84176-872-3.
