= German submarine U-35 (1936) =

German World War II submarine

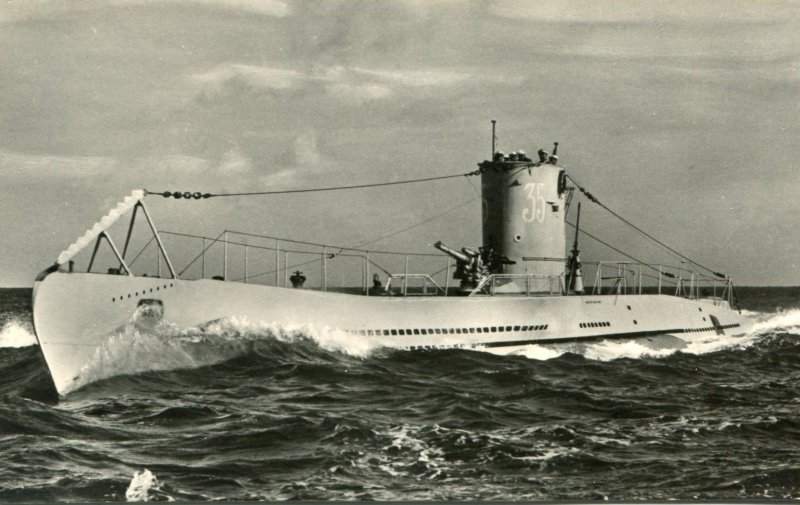

History

Nazi Germany
- Name: U-35
- Ordered: 25 March 1935
- Builder: Germaniawerft, Kiel
- Cost: 4,189,000 Reichsmark
- Yard number: 558
- Laid down: 2 March 1936
- Launched: 24 September 1936
- Commissioned: 3 November 1936
- Fate: Scuttled, 29 November 1939

General characteristics
- Class & type: Type VIIA submarine
- Displacement: 626 tonnes (616 long tons) surfaced; 745 t (733 long tons) submerged
- Length: 64.51 m (211 ft 8 in) o/a; 45.50 m (149 ft 3 in) pressure hull
- Beam: 5.85 m (19 ft 2 in) o/a; 4.70 m (15 ft 5 in) pressure hull
- Height: 9.50 m (31 ft 2 in)
- Draught: 4.37 m (14 ft 4 in)
- Installed power: 2,100–2,310 PS (1,540–1,700 kW; 2,070–2,280 bhp) (diesels); 750 PS (550 kW; 740 shp) (electric)
- Propulsion: 2 shafts; 2 × diesel engines; 2 × electric motors
- Speed: 17 knots (31 km/h; 20 mph) surfaced; 8 knots (15 km/h; 9.2 mph) submerged
- Range: 6,200 nmi (11,500 km; 7,100 mi) at 10 knots (19 km/h; 12 mph) surfaced; 73–94 nmi (135–174 km; 84–108 mi) at 4 knots (7.4 km/h; 4.6 mph) submerged
- Test depth: 220 m (720 ft); Crush depth: 230–250 m (750–820 ft)
- Complement: 4 officers, 40–56 enlisted
- Sensors & processing systems: Gruppenhorchgerät
- Armament: 5 × 53.3 cm (21 in) torpedo tubes (four bow, one stern); 11 × torpedoes or 22 TMA mines; 1 × 8.8 cm (3.46 in) deck gun (220 rounds); 1 × 2 cm (0.79 in) C/30 anti-aircraft gun

Service record
- Part of: 2nd U-boat Flotilla; 3 November 1936 – 29 November 1939
- Identification codes: M 21 203
- Commanders: Kptlt. Klaus Ewerth; 3 November – 5 December 1936; Kptlt. Hans Rudolf Rösing; 6 December 1936 – February 1937; Kptlt. Hermann Michahelles; February – 30 July 1937; Oblt.z.S. Otto Kretschmer; 31 July – 15 August 1937; Kptlt. Werner Lott; 15 August 1937 – 29 November 1939
- Operations: 3 patrols (last pre-war and 2 war): 1st patrol (last pre-war): 27 August – 1 September 1939; 2nd patrol (1st war): 9 September – 12 October 1939; 3rd patrol (2nd war): 18 – 29 November 1939
- Victories: 4 merchant ships sunk (7,850 GRT); 1 merchant ship damaged (6,014 GRT)

German submarine U-35 was a Type VIIA U-boat of Nazi Germany's Kriegsmarine. She was built three years before the start of World War II. The submarine was laid down on 2 March 1936 by Friedrich Krupp Germaniawerft at Kiel, launched on 24 September 1936, and commissioned on 3 November that year under the command of Kapitänleutnant (Kptlt.) Klaus Ewerth. The U-boat was featured on the cover of Life magazine on 16 October 1939, for its then commander Werner Lott "courteously" rescuing and putting to shore all the sailors of a Greek ship that U-35 was about to sink.

U-35 was scuttled just three months into World War II in November 1939. During her service, she conducted three patrols (last pre-war and two war) and sank four vessels for a total loss of 7,850 GRT while damaging one vessel of around 6,014 GRT.

== Construction and design ==
=== Construction ===
U-35 was ordered by the Kriegsmarine on 25 March 1935 (technically in violation of the Treaty of Versailles, but consistent with the soon to be signed Anglo-German Naval Agreement). Her keel was laid down on 2 March 1936 by Friedrich Krupp Germaniawerft in Kiel as yard number 558. She was launched on 24 September 1936 and commissioned on 3 November of that year under the command of Kptlt. Klaus Ewerth.

=== Design ===
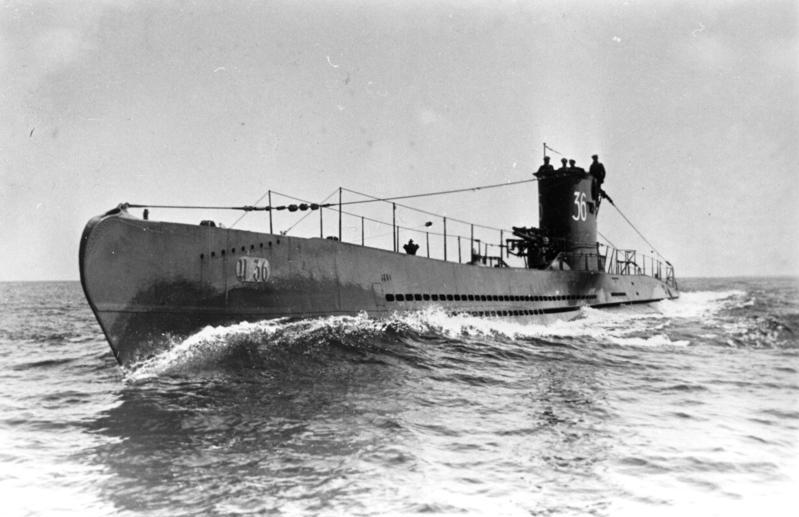
U-36, a U-boat that was almost identical to U-35, during training exercises in 1936

Like all Type VIIA submarines, U-35 displaced 626 tonnes (616 long tons) while surfaced and 745 t (733 long tons) when submerged. She was 64.50 m (211 ft 7 in) in overall length and had a 45.50 m (149 ft 3 in) pressure hull. U-35's propulsion consisted of two MAN 6-cylinder 4-stroke M6V 40/46 diesel engines that totaled 2,100–2,310 PS (1,540–1,700 kW; 2,070–2,280 bhp). Her maximum rpm was between 470 and 485. The submarine was also equipped with two Brown, Boveri & Cie GG UB 720/8 electric motors that totaled 750 PS (550 kW; 740 shp). Their maximum rpm was 322. These power plants gave U-35 a total speed of 17 knots (31 km/h; 20 mph) while surfaced and 8 knots (15 km/h; 9.2 mph) when submerged. This resulted in a range of 6,200 nmi (11,500 km; 7,100 mi) while traveling at 10 knots (19 km/h; 12 mph) on the surface and 73–94 nmi (135–174 km; 84–108 mi) at 4 knots (7.4 km/h; 4.6 mph) when submerged. The U-boat's test depth was 220 m (720 ft) but she could go as deep as 230–250 m (750–820 ft) without having her hull crushed. U-35's armament consisted of five 53.3 cm (21 in) torpedo tubes, (four located in the bow and one in the stern). She could carry up to 11 torpedoes or 22 TMA mines or 33 TMB mines. U-35 was also equipped with a 8.8 cm SK C/35 naval gun and had 220 rounds stowed on board. Her anti-aircraft defenses consisted of one 2 cm (0.79 in) anti-aircraft gun.

== Service history ==
=== Last pre-war patrol ===
U-35's last pre-war patrol began on 27 August 1939, and took her from Memel (in the Baltic) to Kiel, where she arrived on 1 September, the first day of the invasion of Poland.

=== First war patrol ===
The U-boat departed Wilhelmshaven on 9 September 1939. That day, the submarine HMS Ursula fired the first British submarine torpedoes of the war when attacking U-35 about 23 nmi (43 km; 26 mi) north of the Dutch island of Schiermonnikoog. The U-boat escaped without damage and sailed northabout the British Isles to attack shipping.

On 18 September she stopped a group of three fishing trawlers west-north-west of St.Kilda. She sank two with gunfire, the 326 GRT Arlita and the 295 GRT Lord Minto after confiscating their radios and fishing gear but allowing their crews to evacuate. A third trawler, Nancy Hague, was allowed to proceed after taking on the crews of the other vessels.

After 14:10 on 21 September, U-35 fired three torpedoes at Convoy OA-7 south-west of the Isles of Scilly. She missed a destroyer and a tanker, but damaged the 6,014 GRT British tanker Teakwood. The damaged ship was taken to Falmouth in Cornwall, escorted by HMS Ardent. The one sailor killed onboard Teakwood during this attack was the only person to have been killed during World War II in association with U-35.

At 18:45 on 1 October 1939, 42 miles off Ushant, U-35 stopped the unarmed neutral 2,239 GRT Belgian merchant ship Suzon, which was carrying 2,400 tons of pit props from Bordeaux to Cardiff. After the crew abandoned ship after an inspection, she was torpedoed and sunk.

==== Diamantis ====
About 13:15 on 3 October 40 miles west of the Scilly Islands, U-35 stopped the 4,990 GRT Greek freighter Diamantis, which was taking 7,700 tons of manganese ore from Pepel, Sierra Leone, to Barrow-in-Furness. Like Suzon, she was a neutral, but carrying a strategic cargo to Britain and therefore a "legitimate target". The crew, misunderstanding the U-boat's instructions, abandoned ship prematurely. After two G7a torpedoes exploded prematurely, the ship was sunk by a G7e torpedo. Because the ship's lifeboats were not suited for use in bad weather, Lott decided to take all crew members aboard.

U-35's commander Werner Lott later commented:

In the rough weather I would not have been able to examine the ship's papers, so I gave a signal to follow me. I wanted to go to the Irish coast where I knew there would not be such rough weather. They did not follow me so I fired a shot from my gun at the bow of the boat. This had the result that the crew panicked and jumped into the small boats. One could foresee that with the rough seas that they would overturn.

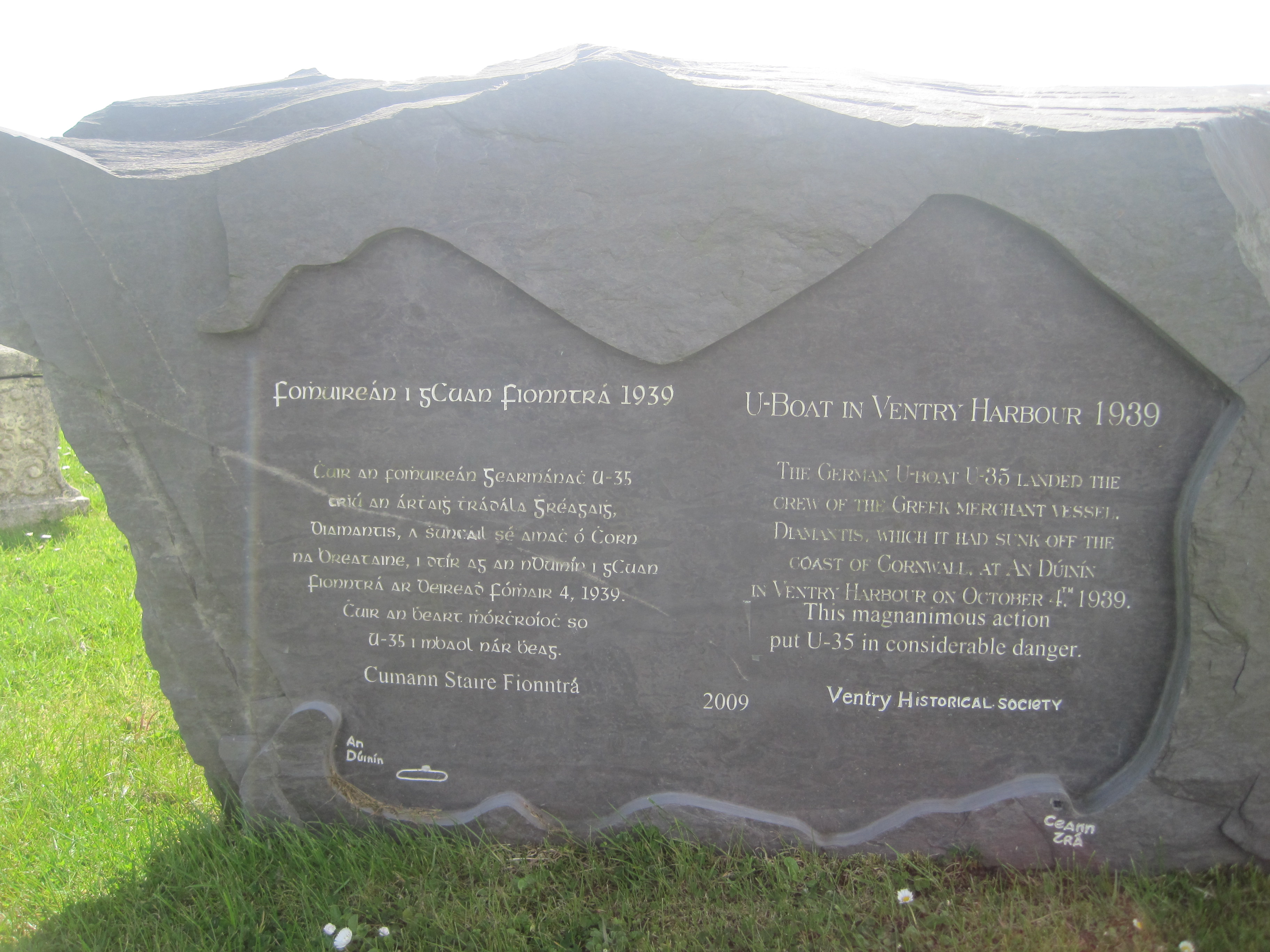
Memorial for U-35 in Ventry

The next day, 4 October, U-35 was seen by people in Ventry and Ballymore, County Kerry easing into the bay. The U-boat launched a dinghy and brought ashore the 28 Greek sailors from Diamantis.

The U-boat returned to Wilhelmshaven on 12 October after 34 days at sea where Lott was reprimanded for his actions, which were regarded as having endangered his crew.

==== Commemoration ====
On Saturday, 17 October 2009, more than 200 people attended various celebratory events in Ventry to mark the rescue and landing of the Greek seamen. The occasion was organised by the newly formed Ventry Historical Society.

The main ceremony was held on the green in front of Quinn's Pub, where an inscribed commemorative stone was erected. Guests included the German Ambassador Dr. Busso von Alvensleben and the Mayor of the Oinousses Islands in the Aegean, Evangelos Elias Angelakos, who unveiled the memorial stone. Other guests included descendants of Panagos Pateras, the captain and owner of the ill-fated Diamantis, officers of Southern Command, members of the Irish Coast Guard, the crew of the Valentia lifeboat, and a troop of Sea Scouts from Tralee.

The secretary of the historical society, Dr. Breandán Ó Ciobháin, delivered a welcoming address in Irish, English, Greek, and German, and invited the German ambassador to address the gathering:

I'm deeply moved about this generous gesture of erecting this memorial. In that terrible war, which we all remember very well, it was indeed an exceptional action that we are going to honour today. I'm more than happy that nowadays our three countries are united in the European Union and that we can be sure that anything like that will never occur again. The only thing that should survive is the sense of magnanimity and of courage that will serve as an example for all of us.

Mayor Angelakos said it was a great honor to attend the Ventry ceremony 70 years after the incident: "I would like to remind you of the magnanimous stance of Werner Lott, the commander of the U-35." The occurrence is one of only two such instances in World War II, where a German submarine crew risked its own safety to protect the crew of a vessel they torpedoed and sank.

=== Second war patrol ===
U-35 sailed from Wilhelmshaven on her second and final war patrol on 18 November 1939. On 29 November 1939 U-35 was scuttled by its crew in the North Sea, in position 60°53′N 02°47′E, after a depth charge attack from the British destroyers Kingston, Icarus, and Kashmir. Lord Louis Mountbatten, commanding the British squadron, took the extraordinary step of stopping his ships for an extended period of time and sending out boats to rescue the crew of the German submarine adrift in water. Consequently, unusual among U-boats lost during the war, all 43 hands on board survived and were taken prisoner. Indeed, every member of the U-35 crew during its short World War 2 service survived the war.

== Summary of raiding history ==
Date	Name of Ship	Nationality	Tonnage (GRT)	Fate
18 September 1939	Arlita	United Kingdom	326	Sunk
18 September 1939	Lord Minto	United Kingdom	295	Sunk
21 September 1939	Teakwood	United Kingdom	6,014	Damaged
1 October 1939	Suzon	Belgium	2,239	Sunk
3 October 1939	Diamantis	Greece	4,990	Sunk

== Bibliography ==
- Busch, Rainer; Röll, Hans-Joachim (1999). German U-boat commanders of World War II : a biographical dictionary. Translated by Brooks, Geoffrey. London, Annapolis, Md: Greenhill Books, Naval Institute Press. ISBN 1-55750-186-6.
- Busch, Rainer; Röll, Hans-Joachim (1999). Deutsche U-Boot-Verluste von September 1939 bis Mai 1945 [German U-boat losses from September 1939 to May 1945]. Der U-Boot-Krieg (in German). Vol. IV. Hamburg, Berlin, Bonn: Mittler. ISBN 3-8132-0514-2.
- Gröner, Erich; Jung, Dieter; Maass, Martin (1991). U-boats and Mine Warfare Vessels. German Warships 1815–1945. Vol. 2. Translated by Thomas, Keith; Magowan, Rachel. London: Conway Maritime Press. ISBN 0-85177-593-4.
- Kemp, Paul (1999). U-Boats Destroyed - German Submarine Losses in the World Wars. London: Arms & Armour. ISBN 1-85409-515-3.
- Warship International Staff (2010). "Wartime Humanity of a U-boat Captain". Warship International. XLVII (3): 280–281. ISSN 0043-0374.
