= German submarine U-36 (1936) =

German World War II submarine

Coordinates: 57°00′N 5°02′E

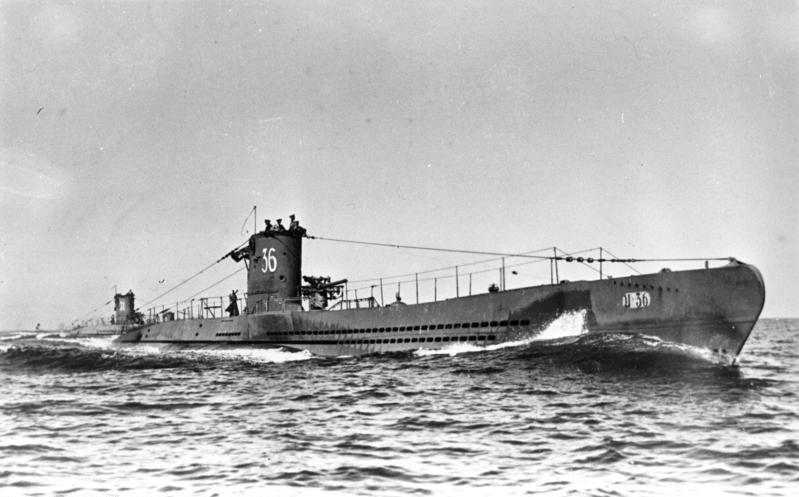
- U-36 at sea in 1936: note the boat's number on the conning tower and hull. They were erased on the commencement of hostilities

History

Nazi Germany
- Name: U-36
- Ordered: 25 March 1935
- Builder: Germaniawerft, Kiel
- Cost: 4,189,000 Reichsmark
- Yard number: 559
- Laid down: 2 March 1936
- Launched: 4 November 1936
- Commissioned: 16 December 1936
- Fate: Sunk, 4 December 1939

General characteristics
- Class & type: Type VIIA submarine
- Displacement: 626 tonnes (616 long tons) surfaced; 745 t (733 long tons) submerged
- Length: 64.51 m (211 ft 8 in) o/a; 45.50 m (149 ft 3 in) pressure hull
- Beam: 5.85 m (19 ft 2 in) o/a; 4.70 m (15 ft 5 in) pressure hull
- Height: 9.50 m (31 ft 2 in)
- Draught: 4.37 m (14 ft 4 in)
- Installed power: 2,100–2,310 PS (1,540–1,700 kW; 2,070–2,280 bhp) (diesels); 750 PS (550 kW; 740 shp) (electric)
- Propulsion: 2 shafts; 2 × diesel engines; 2 × electric motors
- Speed: 17 knots (31 km/h; 20 mph) surfaced; 8 knots (15 km/h; 9.2 mph) submerged
- Range: 6,200 nmi (11,500 km; 7,100 mi) at 10 knots (19 km/h; 12 mph) surfaced; 73–94 nmi (135–174 km; 84–108 mi) at 4 knots (7.4 km/h; 4.6 mph) submerged
- Test depth: 220 m (720 ft); Crush depth: 230–250 m (750–820 ft)
- Complement: 4 officers, 40–56 enlisted
- Sensors & processing systems: Gruppenhorchgerät
- Armament: 5 × 53.3 cm (21 in) torpedo tubes (four bow, one stern); 11 torpedoes or 22 TMA mines; 1 × 8.8 cm (3.46 in) deck gun (220 rounds); 1 × 2 cm (0.79 in) C/30 anti-aircraft gun

Service record
- Part of: U-boat School Flotilla; 16 December 1936 – 1 August 1939; 2nd U-boat Flotilla; 1 September – 4 December 1939
- Identification codes: M 13 703
- Commanders: Kptlt. Klaus Ewerth; 16 December 1936 – 31 October 1938; Kptlt. / K.Kapt. Wilhelm Fröhlich; 1 February – 4 December 1939
- Operations: 3 patrols: 1st patrol: 31 August – 6 September 1939; 2nd patrol: 7 – 30 September 1939; 3rd patrol: 2 – 4 December 1939
- Victories: 2 merchant ships sunk (2,813 GRT); 1 merchant ship taken as prize (1,617 GRT)

German submarine U-36 was a Type VIIA U-boat of Nazi Germany's Kriegsmarine which served during World War II. She was constructed in the earliest days of the U-boat arm at Kiel in 1936, and served in the pre-war Navy in the Baltic Sea and North Sea under Kapitänleutnant (Kptlt.) Klaus Ewerth. Korvettenkapitän (K.Kapt.) Wilhelm Fröhlich took command in October 1938 and continued in the role until the boat was lost.

During her service, U-36 undertook three patrols (1 pre-war and 2 war), but was sunk by a torpedo fired by HMS Salmon. She was lost with all hands.

== Construction and design ==
=== Construction ===
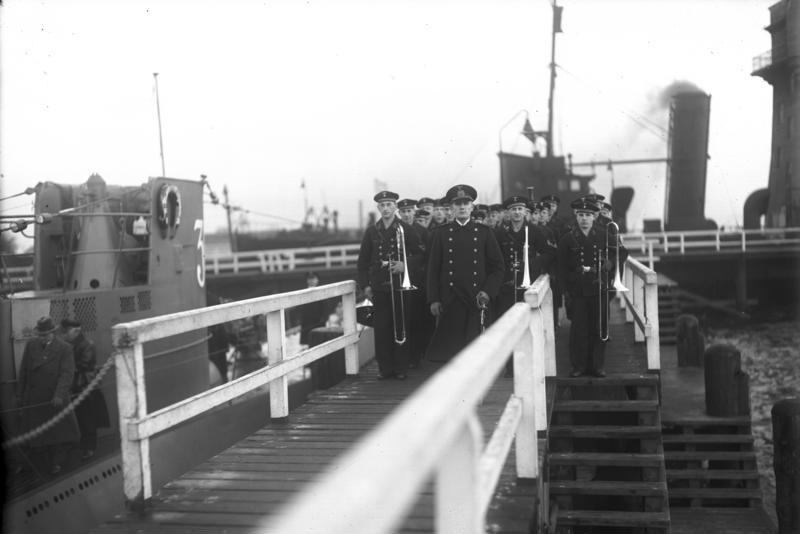
U-36 is commissioned, December 1936

U-36 was ordered by the Kriegsmarine on 25 March 1935 as part of the German Plan Z and in violation of the Treaty of Versailles. Her keel was laid down in the AG Weser shipyard in Bremen as yard number 559 on 2 March 1936. After about eight months of construction, she was launched on 4 November 1936 and commissioned on 16 December under the command of Kptlt. Klaus Ewerth.

=== Design ===
Like all Type VIIA submarines, U-36 displaced 626 tonnes (616 long tons) while surfaced and 745 t (733 long tons) when submerged. She was 64.51 m (211 ft 8 in) in overall length and had a 45.50 m (149 ft 3 in) pressure hull. U-36's propulsion consisted of two MAN 6-cylinder 4-stroke M6V 40/46 diesel engines that totaled 2,100–2,310 PS (1,540–1,700 kW; 2,070–2,280 bhp). Her maximum rpm was between 470 and 485. The submarine was also equipped with two Brown, Boveri & Cie GG UB 720/8 electric motors that totaled 750 PS (550 kW; 740 shp). Their maximum rpm was 322. These engines gave U-36 a total speed of 17 knots (31 km/h; 20 mph) while surfaced and 8 knots (15 km/h; 9.2 mph) when submerged. This resulted in a range of 6,200 nmi (11,500 km; 7,100 mi) while traveling at 10 knots (19 km/h; 12 mph) on the surface and 73–94 nmi (135–174 km; 84–108 mi) at 4 knots (7.4 km/h; 4.6 mph) when submerged. The U-boat's test depth was 220 m (720 ft) but she could go as deep as 230–250 m (750–820 ft) without having her hull crushed.

U-36's armament consisted of five 53.3 cm (21 in) torpedo tubes (four located in the bow and one in the stern). She could have up to 11 torpedoes on board or 22 TMA or 33 TMB mines. U-36 was also equipped with a 8.8 cm SK C/35 naval gun and had 220 rounds for it stowed on board. Her anti-aircraft defenses consisted of one 2 cm (0.79 in) anti-aircraft gun.

== Service history ==
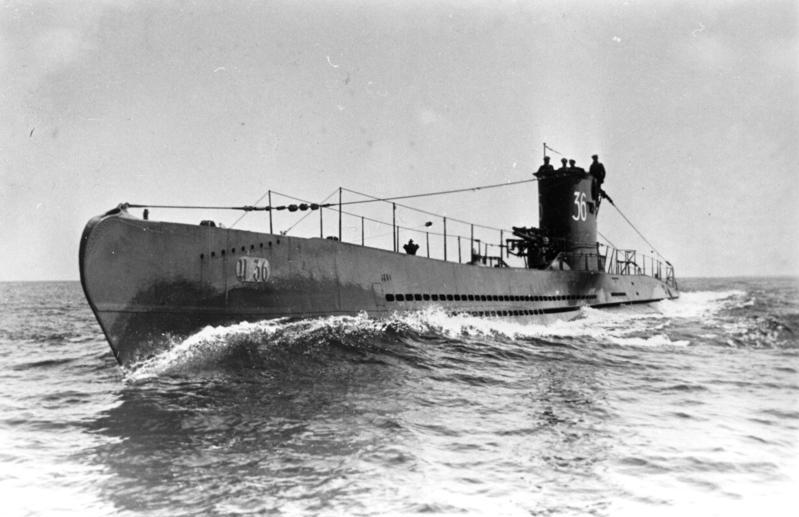
U-36 on a training exercise in 1936

=== First war patrol ===
U-36 was at sea when the war broke out, having set out from Wilhelmshaven on 31 August 1939. She arrived in Kiel on 6 September and the following day departed for her first war patrol. She then patrolled the North Sea for three weeks, hoping to catch ships traveling between Britain and Scandinavia carrying war supplies. During this patrol, the boat sank two steamers, Truro and Silesia—one British and the other from neutral Sweden—carrying British produce.

Seahorse, a British submarine, later fired on U-36 and subsequently claimed to have sunk her, although in fact the torpedo missed. On 27 September Fröhlich and his crew captured another Swedish vessel, Algeria, which he proceeded to escort back to Germany as the patrol came to an end. She returned to her berth in Kiel at the end of September, where she remained until December.

=== Second war patrol ===
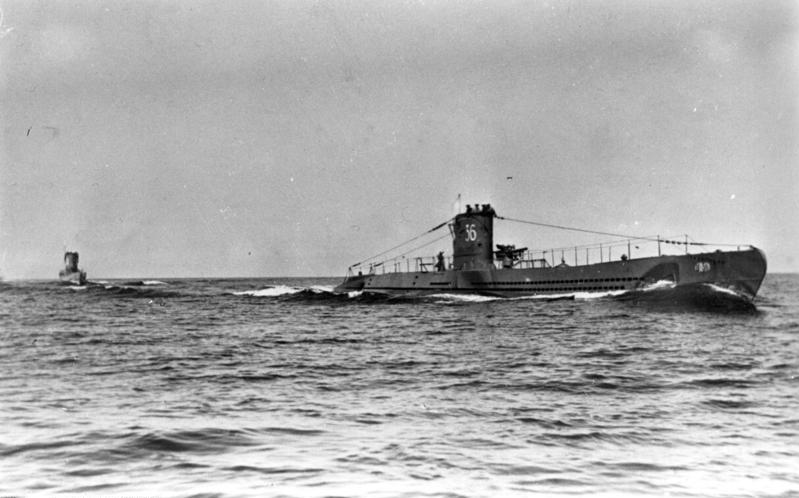
U-36 with another U-boat in the background, at sea in 1936

On 17 November 1939, Naval High Command (SKL) issued orders for U-36 and U-38 to scout the location for Basis Nord, a secret German naval base for raids on Allied shipping located off the Kola Peninsula and provided by the Soviet Union. The mission required coded messages to be flashed to Soviet naval vessels patrolling the area preceding a Soviet escort to the prospective base location.

However, U-36 never left the Norwegian Sea. On 4 December 1939, two days out of Wilhelmshaven, she was spotted on the surface near the Norwegian port of Stavanger by the British submarine Salmon. Salmon then fired one torpedo at her unwitting counterpart. It sank U-36, all 40 of the sailors aboard were lost. During the same patrol, the Salmon also torpedoed the light cruisers Leipzig and Nürnberg.

Following the loss of U-36, U-38 continued towards the Kola Peninsula, successfully reaching the location and accomplished the scouting mission for Basis Nord.

== Summary of raiding history ==
Date	Ship	Nationality	Tonnage (GRT)	Fate
15 September 1939	Truro	United Kingdom	974	Sunk
25 September 1939	Silesia	Sweden	1,839	Sunk
27 September 1939	Algeria	Sweden	1,617	Captured as prize

== Bibliography ==
- Busch, Rainer; Röll, Hans-Joachim (1999). German U-boat commanders of World War II : a biographical dictionary. Translated by Brooks, Geoffrey. London, Annapolis, Md: Greenhill Books, Naval Institute Press. ISBN 1-55750-186-6.
- Busch, Rainer; Röll, Hans-Joachim (1999). Der U-Boot-Krieg, 1939-1945: Deutsche U-Boot-Verluste von September 1939 bis Mai 1945 [German U-boat losses from September 1939 to May 1945] (in German). Vol. IV. Hamburg, Berlin, Bonn: Mittler. ISBN 3-8132-0514-2.
- Gröner, Eric; Jung, Dieter; Maass, Martin (1991). German Warships 1815-1945: U-boats and Mine Warfare Vessels. Vol. 2. Translated by Thomas, Keith; Magowan, Rachel. London: Conway Maritime. ISBN 0-85177-593-4.
- Blair, Clay (2000) [1996]. Hitler's U-boat War. Vol. 1: The Hunters, 1939–1942. New York: Modern Library. ISBN 0-679-64032-0.
- Philbin III, Tobias R. (1994). The Lure of Neptune: German-Soviet Naval Collaboration and Ambitions, 1919–1941. Chapel Hill: University of South Carolina Press. ISBN 0-87249-992-8.
- Roskill, Stephen (1998) [1960]. The Navy at War 1939–1945. Ware: Wordsworth Editions. ISBN 1-85326-697-3.
- Sharpe, Peter (1998). U-Boat Fact File. Midland Publishing. ISBN 1-85780-072-9.
