= SS Silesia =

Several steamships have been named Silesia after the province of Schlesien

- SS Silesia (1869) was a 3142-ton passenger-cargo ship of Hamburg America Line, in service until 1887
- SS Silesia (1897) was a 4861-ton passenger-cargo ship in service with Hamburg America Line 1898–1918, built as Wally. She was briefly aground off Pusan, Korea, in 1912.
- SS Silesia (1898) was a 5159-ton passenger-cargo ship built for Lloyd Austriaco; sequestered by the Italian government in 1920 and claimed as a war prize by the Chinese government.
- SS Silesia (1923) was a 1899-ton Swedish cargo vessel sunk by the German submarine U-36 off the Norwegian coast near Stavanger on 25 November 1939.

== See also ==
- SMS Schlesien, German pre-dreadnought battleship
