= HMS Gladiolus (K34) =

Flower-class corvette

History

United Kingdom
- Name: HMS Gladiolus
- Ordered: 25 July 1939
- Builder: Smiths Dock Company, River Tees
- Laid down: 19 October 1939
- Launched: 24 January 1940
- Commissioned: 6 April 1940
- Identification: Pennant number:K34
- Fate: Sunk off Iceland on 16 October 1941

General characteristics
- Class & type: Flower-class corvette
- Displacement: 925 long tons (940 t)
- Length: 205 ft (62 m)
- Beam: 33 ft (10 m)
- Draught: 11.5 ft (3.5 m)
- Propulsion: Two fire tube boilers; one 4-cycle triple-expansion steam engine
- Speed: 16 kn (30 km/h) at 2,750 hp (2,050 kW)
- Range: 3,500 nmi (6,500 km) at 12 kn (22 km/h)
- Complement: 85 men
- Armament: 1 × BL 4 in (102 mm) Mk IX gun, 2 × .50 in (12.7 mm) twin machine guns, 2 × .303 in (7.7 mm) Lewis machine guns; 2 × stern depth charge racks with 40 depth charges

HMS Gladiolus was a Flower-class corvette of the Royal Navy, the first ship of her class.

She was laid down at Smiths Dock Company on the River Tees on 19 October 1939, launched on 24 January 1940, and commissioned on 6 April 1940. Gladiolus was active in the Battle of the Atlantic in World War II and spent most of her service career on convoy escort duty in the North Atlantic. She was lost in action on 16 October 1941.

== Service history ==
After commissioning and working up, Gladiolus was assigned to the Western Approaches Escort Force. In her 18 months of service she escorted over 40 convoys, of which over a dozen were attacked; Gladiolus was involved in four major convoy battles, and participated destroying three U-boats.

She was engaged in all the duties performed by corvettes; escorting convoys, searching for and attacking U-boats which attacked ships in convoy, and rescuing survivors.

On 28 June 1940 she picked up 35 survivors from SS Llanarth, that had been torpedoed and sunk by Fritz-Julius Lemp's U-30.

Gladiolus was involved in the sinking of the Type I U-boat U-26 on 1 July 1940. This was the first U-boat kill by a corvette. U-26 had been heavily damaged by eight depth charges from Gladiolus, as well as bombs from a Short Sunderland aircraft, and subsequently scuttled herself.

As one of the early Flowers Gladiolus suffered from the drawbacks of her type; a short forecastle, merchant type bridge, and poor habitability. In October 1940 she went into dock for remedial work and was re-fitted with a longer foc’s’le to improve her habitability. This necessitated ballasting, to avoid pitch problems, and a tilt test, to check stability. These were satisfactory, and she returned to action in January 1941, assigned to one of the new escort groups, 2 EG, led by HMS Douglas.

In April 1941 Gladiolus involved in the battle for HX 121. On 28 April Gladiolus was sent with the destroyers HMS Roxborough and Leamington to re-inforce HX 121 which was under attack. During the onslaught Gladiolus and the destroyers gained contact and made a series of attacks; it was subsequently shown this was on U-96, which escaped. Douglas also gained a contact and made an attack, but saw no result. On 29 April Gladiolus rescued survivors from Beacon Grange which had been torpedoed by U-552. Later that day she sighted a U-boat on the surface and attacked, being rewarded with a gush of air bubbles and wreckage. Gladiolus was credited with destroying U-65, but post-war re-evaluation found no U-boat attacked that day, and attributed U-65's destruction to the attack by Douglas the previous day.

In June 1941 HX 133 came under attack; Gladiolus was detached from escorting OB 335 to join as reinforcement. On 24/25 June, after midnight, she sighted U-71, and attacked. She attempted to ram, but slowed to avoid major damage, and U-71 dived away. Gladiolus then launched five attacks, using 30 depth charges altogether, and was joined by HMS Nasturtium, which launched another six. U-71 was severely damaged, and surfaced to try to escape on the surface; Gladiolus and Nasturtium opened fire, scoring hits on U-71's conning tower. Gladiolus claimed a kill for this, and was credited with sinking U-71, but the boat escaped to base. On 26/27 June in early hours, U-556 attacked the convoy, and was sighted by Nasturtium. She attacked and was joined by Celandine and Gladiolus. Altogether the three corvettes launched 50 depth charges; U-556 was forced to the surface as Gladiolus dropped a further three depth charges; the corvettes then opened fire at point-blank range, hitting U-556's conning tower. Her captain, Wohlfarth and the crew abandoned ship, and the boat sank before she could be secured.

In September 1941 Gladiolus was involved in the battle for SC 42. Under major attack, SC 42 lost 15 ships in two days, for the destruction of one U-boat. Numerous escorts were drafted in as reinforcement; on 11 September Gladiolus arrived with EG 2, led by Douglas. SC 42 was stalked for a further five days, losing two more ships, though the destroyers of EG 2 were able to sink another U-boat. This was, after SC 7, the worst convoy loss in the North Atlantic during the war.

Following this, Gladiolus was reassigned to the Newfoundland Local Escort Group, led by HMCS Columbia. In October 1941 she was part of the escort for SC 48, during which battle Gladiolus was lost.

== Fate ==
Gladiolus was lost in October 1941 whilst escorting SC 48. At the time, she was under the command of Lieutenant Commander H. M. C. Sanders.

British sources record Gladiolus separated from SC 48 on the night of 15/16 October. At 2130 Empire Heron was hit, and Gladiolus was detached to chase down the attacker and search for survivors. At 2200 she signalled she had picked up one man, and was continuing to search. This was her last contact; nothing more is known of her, and there were no survivors from either vessel. It was believed that she had been sunk while picking up survivors or been lost in a marine accident.

However German sources, assuming Gladiolus was on station, credited her loss to possible hits reported by U-558 or U-432 during the melee on the night of 16/17 October: Another source has argued definitively for a stray torpedo from U-553 at 00.07. However historian Bernard Edwards is clear that Gladiolus was lost without rejoining the convoy; while acknowledging the claim for a loss in the early hours of the 17th, he states it is more likely that she went down before that.

In an interview with the BBC, former crew member Dick Turner speculated Gladiolus was unstable due to her refit, and had overturned during a violent manoeuvre.

In the absence of any conclusive explanation, the actual cause of her loss is unknown.
