= SS Binnendijk =

Dutch cargo steamship sunk by a mine off Portland Bill in the English Channel

History

Netherlands
- Name: Binnendijk
- Owner: NASM
- Operator: Holland America Line
- Port of registry: Rotterdam
- Builder: I.M. 'De Noord', Alblasserdam
- Yard number: 131
- Launched: 30 June 1921
- Completed: 18 December 1921
- Maiden voyage: 24 December 1921
- Identification: code letters NHBK (until 1933); call sign PDDB (1934 onward)
- Fate: mined, 7 October 1939

General characteristics
- Class & type: NASM "B" class
- Type: cargo ship
- Tonnage: 6,873 GRT, 4,240 NRT, 9,939 DWT
- Length: 416.3 ft (126.9 m) overall; 400.4 ft (122.0 m) registered
- Beam: 54.3 ft (16.6 m)
- Draught: 30 ft 2 in (9.19 m)
- Depth: 36.6 ft (11.2 m)
- Decks: 2 + shelter deck
- Installed power: 648 NHP, 3,000 SHP
- Propulsion: 2 × steam turbines; double-reduction gearing; 1 × screw
- Speed: 12 knots (22 km/h)
- Capacity: cargo: 527,000 cu ft (14,900 m^{3}) grain; 478,000 cu ft (13,500 m^{3}) bale; passengers: as built: 3 × 1st class; 1934: 7
- Crew: 42
- Sensors & processing systems: wireless direction finding (by 1937)
- Notes: one of a class of eight sister ships

SS Binnendijk was a Holland America Line (NASM) cargo steamship. She was one of NASM's "B" class ships: the company's first cargo ships to be powered by steam turbines. Binnendijk was built in South Holland in 1921, and sunk by a mine in the English Channel in 1939. She was the first ship that NASM lost in the Second World War. Her wreck off the coast of Dorset, England is now a wreck diving site, nicknamed "The Benny".

Some sources anglicise the ship's name to Binnendyk. However, Lloyd's Register always recorded her as Binnendijk.

== "B" class turbine steamships ==
Until 1920, every NASM cargo ship was propelled by a reciprocating steam engine; in most cases triple-expansion. However, in April of that year C. van der Giessen & Zonen's shipyard in Krimpen aan den IJssel laid down the first of a class of new ships of about 6,850 GRT for NASM. Each member of the class was to be driven by two Brown-Curtis steam turbines, driving a single screw via double-reduction gearing.

Van der Giessen launched the first ship in October 1920 as Burgerdijk, completed her in June 1921, and went on to build three more members of the class. Industrieële Maatschappij 'De Noord', on the Noord river in Alblasserdam built two, including the final member of the class, Boschdijk, which was completed in October 1922. Boele's Scheepswerven & Machinefabriek in Bolnes in South Holland built one, and Maatschappij voor Scheeps- en Werktuigbouw Fijenoord in Rotterdam built one.

== Building Binnendijk ==
'De Noord' built Binnendijk, which was the third member of the class to be completed. She was yard number 131, and was launched on 30 June 1921. Harland & Wolff built her turbines, so she was towed from the Noord to Belfast, Ireland, where she arrived on 1 October for them to be installed. She was completed on 18 December.

Her lengths were 416.3 ft (126.9 m) overall and 400.4 ft (122.0 m) registered. Her beam was 54.3 ft (16.6 m) and her depth was 36.6 ft (11.2 m). Her tonnages were 6,873 GRT, 4,240 NRT and 9,939 DWT. Her holds had capacity for 527,000 cu ft (14,900 m^{3}) of grain, or 478,000 cu ft (13,500 m^{3}) of baled cargo. She also had three berths for first class passengers.

The combined power output of Binnendijk's turbines was rated at 648 NHP or 3,000 SHP. They gave her a speed of 12 knots (22 km/h).

== Career ==
NASM registered Binnendijk at Rotterdam. Her code letters were NHBK. She began her maiden voyage on 24 December 1921.

In December 1929 Binnendijk was in Philadelphia when she was seriously damaged by fire. She returned to Rotterdam for repairs.

By 1934 the call sign PDDB had supreseded Binnendijk's code letters. Also in 1934, her accommodation was increased to carry seven passengers. By 1937 she was equipped with wireless direction finding.

== Loss ==
In September 1939 Binnendijk left New York carrying general cargo, bound for Rotterdam. On 7 October she was in the English Channel when the Royal Navy ordered her to put into Portland Harbour to allow her cargo to be inspected for contraband. It was sunset, so Binnendijk's Master, Captain WPJ Morée, requested permission to anchor for the night near the Shambles Sandbank, off Portland Bill.

A month earlier, on 8 September, U-26 had mined the area. By 22:00 hrs Binnendijk had detonated a magnetic mine about 2 1/2 nautical miles (4.6 km) southeast of the Shambles lightship. Captain Morée was on the bridge at the time. The explosion put her engines and wireless telegraph out of action, and she caught fire. Her crew fired rocket flares, which were answered. A British examination vessel came alongside and rescued all 42 members of her crew.

The ship was burning from stem to stern when she sank the next day, at position 50°32′N 2°20′W, about 1 nautical mile (1.9 km) north of the lightship. Sources disagree as to whether she sank at 02:00 or 14:00 hrs. On 10 October the Royal Navy used explosives to disperse her wreck.

== Fate of "B" class sister ships ==
In 1930 Blijdendijk's cargo caught fire in the Gulf of Suez. She was declared a constructive total loss, and towed to Italy to be scrapped.

In 1940 U-48 sank Burgerdijk and U-47 sank Bilderdijk. In 1941 Beemsterdijk was sunk by a mine, killing 39 of her crew. Boschdijk was burnt out in the German invasion of the Netherlands in 1940, and towed to the Baltic in 1942, where the Luftwaffe sank her as target practice. Also in 1942, U-68 sank Breedijk, killing her Master and a member of her crew.

Blommersdijk was the only "B" class ship to survive the Second World War. In 1957 an Italian shipping company bought her and renamed her Vivara. She was scrapped in 1959.

== Wreck ==
Binnendijk's wreck is on Lulworth Banks at a depth of 75 to 89 feet (23 to 27 m). The wreck is now much broken up, but parts stand 23 to 26 feet (7 to 8 m) above the seabed. As of 2012, many of her frames and hull plates were still intact. The most intact part was the stern. Enough of her engine room was extant for penetration diving. Parts of her cargo were still visible, including tyres, and copper wire. The wreck provides habitat for lobster, spider crabs, conger eel, pouting, pollock, and tompot blenny. The site is relatively sheltered by Portland Bill, but is near Portland Race, so can be subject to strong currents.

== Bibliography ==
- Haws, Duncan (1995). Holland America Line. Merchant Fleets series. Vol. 28. Uckfield: Travel Creatours Ltd Publications. ISBN 0946378258.
- Lloyd's Register of Shipping. Vol. II.–Steamers and Motor Vessels. London: Lloyd's Register of Shipping. 1922 – via Internet Archive.
- Lloyd's Register of Shipping (PDF). Vol. II.–Steamers and Motorships of 300 Tons Gross and Over. London: Lloyd's Register of Shipping. 1934 – via Southampton City Council.
- Lloyd's Register of Shipping (PDF). Vol. II.–Steamers and Motorships of 300 Tons Gross and Over. London: Lloyd's Register of Shipping. 1937 – via Southampton City Council.
