= HMS Kingston (F64) =

Destroyer of the Royal Navy

- Profile view of Kingston

History

United Kingdom
- Name: Kingston
- Builder: J. Samuel White and Company, Cowes, Isle of Wight
- Laid down: 6 October 1937
- Launched: 9 January 1939
- Sponsored by: Royal Borough of Kingston upon Thames
- Commissioned: 14 September 1939
- Identification: Pennant number: F64
- Fate: Constructive total loss after naval action and airstrikes, scrapped at Malta

General characteristics (as built)
- Class & type: K-class destroyer
- Displacement: 1,690 long tons (1,720 t) (standard)
- Length: 356 ft 6 in (108.7 m) o/a
- Beam: 35 ft 9 in (10.9 m)
- Draught: 12 ft 6 in (3.8 m) (deep)
- Installed power: 2 × Admiralty 3-drum boilers; 44,000 shp (33,000 kW)
- Propulsion: 2 × shafts; 2 × geared steam turbines
- Speed: 36 knots (67 km/h; 41 mph)
- Range: 5,500 nmi (10,200 km; 6,300 mi) at 15 knots (28 km/h; 17 mph)
- Complement: 183 (218 for flotilla leaders)
- Sensors & processing systems: ASDIC
- Armament: 3 × twin 4.7 in (120 mm) guns; 1 × quadruple 2 pdr (40 mm (1.6 in)) AA guns; 2 × quadruple 0.5 in (12.7 mm) machineguns; 2 × quintuple 21 in (533 mm) torpedo tubes; 1 × depth charge rack; 2 × throwers; 20 × depth charges

HMS Kingston was a K-class destroyer built for the Royal Navy during the 1930s.

== The early years ==
Kingston was laid down by J. Samuel White and Company at Cowes on the Isle of Wight on 6 October 1937 as part of an order for six similar destroyers. She was launched at East Cowes on 9 January 1939 and named by the Mayoress of Kingston upon Thames. Commissioned on 14 September 1939 with the pennant number F64, she joined the 5th Destroyer Flotilla, Home Fleet, for convoy defence and anti-submarine duties in the North Sea.

In company with the destroyers HMS Kashmir and HMS Icarus, Kingston attacked U-35 with depth charges in the North Sea off Shetland on 29 November 1939, and forced her to scuttle. All the crew of the U-boat were rescued and taken prisoner.

== Red Sea operations ==
In May 1940 she was transferred to the Red Sea. Her pennant number for visual signalling purposes was changed to G64. In June she took part in the sinking of the Italian submarine Torricelli off Perim Island, and later attacked the Italian submarine Perla. On 17 March 1941 she supported landings at Berbera, British Somaliland. On 5 April Kingston found the Leone-class destroyers Pantera and Tigre aground south of Jeddah whose hulls, having been scuttled by the Italians, were destroyed by gunfire and air attack.

== Force C and the battles of Sirte ==
In April 1941 Kingston was deployed to Alexandria to join the Eastern Mediterranean Fleet. There, she was involved in the evacuation of Allied troops from mainland Greece to Crete. On 20 May she deployed as part of Force C to the Battle of Crete.

On the night of 21 May 1941 Force C intercepted a convoy of 20 troop carrying caiques escorted by the Italian torpedo boat Lupo heading for Crete. Ten of the caiques were sunk and the landing prevented, but Lupo successfully covered the withdrawal of the remainder of the convoy. Cruiser HMS Orion was damaged in the action.

On 22 May 1941 Force C was sent to the Aegean Sea through the Kasos Strait to intercept a further invasion convoy of 30 caiques, escorted by the Sagittario. One detached caique was sunk and, although the British did not press the attack on the main convoy, the Germans were forced to abort their attempt to reach Crete. Nonetheless, Sagittario covered the convoy's retreat by lying a smoke screen and firing her guns and torpedoes at the British squadron. According to British sources, Kingston suffered no damage from the naval engagement (Note: Italian claims that RIN Sagittario damaged HMS Kingston are not support by official Admiralty damage reports.) but splinter damage was reported from German air attacks. Force C was the target of fierce airstrikes which continued when they joined up with Force A1 at the Kithera channel. Kingston and HMS Kandahar were sent to pick up survivors when the destroyer HMS Greyhound was bombed and sunk. Later the same day the cruisers HMS Gloucester and Fiji were also lost to air attacks. On 23 May Kingston and Kandahar returned and rescued 523 survivors.

She returned to Alexandria on 24 May 1941, and was taken in hand for repairs and modifications, among which was the replacement of the aft set of torpedo tubes with a four-inch anti-aircraft gun in recognition of the devastating effect of the air attacks suffered by Force C.

Kingston was engaged in defensive convoy duties to Tobruk and often as part of the escort for Breconshire on runs to Malta. She was also in action against Axis convoys and against the Vichy French in Syria.

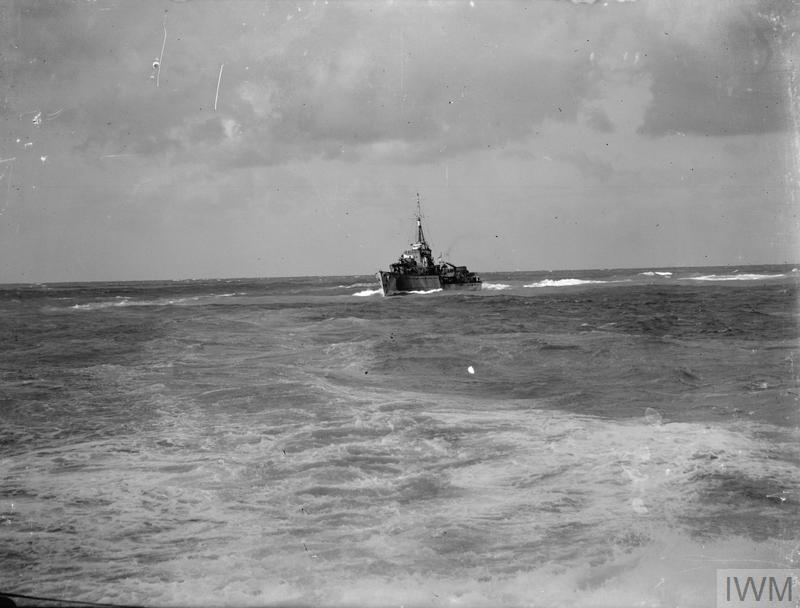
Kingston on anti-submarine patrol, eastern Mediterranean, 25 December 1941

On 17 December 1941 she took part in a brief engagement with the Italian Fleet, known as the First Battle of Sirte.

On 22 March 1942 Kingston took part of the escort of convoy MW10 in the Second Battle of Sirte, where, as the destroyers turned to fire their torpedoes on the Italian battle fleet, she was hit by a 15-inch shell fired by the Italian battleship Littorio which passed right through the foremost starboard whaleboat and burst under the anti-aircraft guns mounting, leaving a big hole in the deck; despite this, she launched three torpedoes. Fifteen men of her crew were killed in this incident, which left the destroyer temporarily dead in the water, the whaleboat torn to pieces, her anti-aircraft guns, searchlight tower and torpedo launchers smashed by the explosion, her starboard boiler and port engine out of action. According to some authors, like James Sadkovich and Vincent O'Hara, she was instead struck by an 8-inch round from the heavy cruiser Gorizia. Maurizio Brescia agrees with the later on the caliber, but credits the heavy cruiser Trento with the hit. With an engine in flames and a flooded boiler, she managed to recover her speed with the remaining engine, reaching Malta the next day.

== Air raids and loss ==
On 4 April 1942, whilst the destroyer was in dock at Malta repairing the damage from the naval encounter, a bomb fell directly at the entrance of the Corradino tunnel, where part of her crew had taken shelter. Fourteen crewmen were killed by the blast including Commander Philip Somerville DSO., Lieutenant P. Hague, and Yeoman of Signals John Murphy, who was at their side, whilst directing the men into the safety of the Corradino tunnel. All 14 crewmen are buried at either the Mtarfa Military Cemetery or the Capuccini Naval Cemetery. Approximately 35 dock workers were also wounded.

Kingston was attacked by German aircraft on 5 April and was further damaged by a near miss. On 8 April she was hit by a bomb, forward. This penetrated the decks and passed out of the ships bottom without exploding. But now the destroyer needed to go into dry dock for underwater repairs. On 9 April she was placed in No. 4 dock, but remained afloat. By 11 April she was still afloat in the dock. – perhaps plates bent outwards by the passage of the bomb through the bottom made it impossible to dock-down and these plates were being burnt away by divers. At about 17.30 on 11 April 1942 she was hit on the port side amidships in the area of the bulkhead between the engine-room and the gearing-room by Junkers Ju 87 aircraft from Sturzkampfgeschwader 3. She rolled over on her port side and sank in the dock. The ship was declared a constructive total loss. On 21 January 1943 the No. 4 dock was dried-out. The damaged midships part of the destroyer was scrapped, thus separating the destroyer in two sections. Dummy bulkheads were fitted to make the two sections float-able while an amount of the superstructure was burnt away. The two sections of Kingston were floated out of the dock on 5 April 1943 and in June were scuttled as a blockship between the Selmun headland and Selmunett Island (St Paul's Island) in northern Malta in the preparations for making a safe anchorage before the invasion of Sicily. In the early 1950s the two sections of the Kingston were scrapped, where sunk, by Italian shipbreakers.

== Research Material ==
- Imperial War Museum archives collection "George Sear"
- Imperial War Museum archives collection "John Murphy"
