= German submarine U-26 (1936) =

German World War II submarine

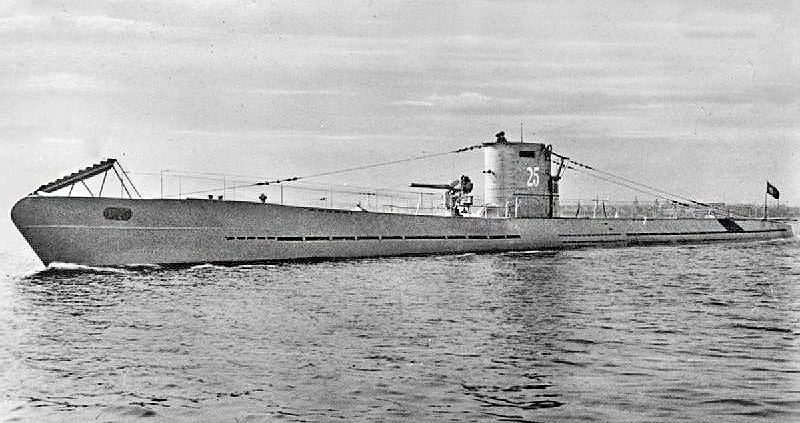
- U-25, the other Type IA U-boat

History

Nazi Germany
- Name: U-26
- Ordered: 17 December 1934
- Builder: DeSchiMAG AG Weser, Bremen
- Yard number: 904
- Laid down: 1 August 1935
- Launched: 14 March 1936
- Commissioned: 6 May 1936
- Fate: Scuttled 1 July 1940, southwest of Ireland. 48 survivors

General characteristics
- Type: Type IA ocean-going submarine
- Displacement: 862 t (848 long tons) surfaced; 982 t (966 long tons) submerged; Official displacement was 712 tons standard
- Length: 72.39 m (237 ft 6 in)
- Beam: 6.21 m (20 ft 4 in)
- Draught: 4.30 m (14 ft 1 in)
- Propulsion: Diesel-electric; 2 × MAN M8V40/46 8-cylinder diesel engines with 2,900–3,080 PS (2,860–3,040 shp; 2,130–2,270 kW); 2 × BBC GG UB720/8 double-acting electric motors with 1,000 PS (990 shp; 740 kW)
- Speed: 18.6 knots (34.4 km/h; 21.4 mph) surfaced; 8.3 knots (15.4 km/h; 9.6 mph) submerged
- Range: 7,900 nmi (14,600 km; 9,100 mi) at 10 knots (19 km/h; 12 mph) surfaced; 78 nmi (144 km; 90 mi) at 4 knots (7.4 km/h; 4.6 mph) submerged
- Test depth: 200 m (660 ft)
- Complement: 4 officers, 39 enlisted
- Armament: 6 × 53.3 cm (21 in) torpedo tubes, 4 bow, 2 stern; 14 × torpedoes; 28 × TMA mines; 1 × 10.5 cm (4.1 in) SK C/32 naval gun; 1 × 2 cm (0.79 in) C/30 AA gun

Service record
- Part of: 2nd U-boat Flotilla; 1 May 1936 – 1 August 1939; 1 September 1939 – 1 July 1940
- Identification codes: M 07 314
- Commanders: KrvKpt. Werner Hartmann; 11 May 1936 – 30 September 1938; FrgKpt. Oskar Schomburg; 1 October 1938 – August 1939; Kptlt. / KrvKpt. Klaus Ewerth; August 1939 – 3 January 1940; Kptlt. Heinz Scheringer; 4 January – 11 May 1940; KrvKpt. Heinz Fischer; 12 May – 8 June 1940; Kptlt. Heinz Scheringer; 9 June – 1 July 1940
- Operations: 6 patrols: 1st patrol: 29 August – 26 September 1939; 2nd patrol: 22 October – 5 December 1939; 3rd patrol: 29 January – 1 March 1940; 4th patrol: a. 13 – 18 April 1940; b. 19 – 25 April 1940; 5th patrol: a. 23 – 27 May 1940; b. 29 May – 5 June 1940; 6th patrol: 20 June – 1 July 1940
- Victories: 11 merchant ships sunk (48.645 GRT); 1 merchant ship damaged (4,871 GRT)

German submarine U-26 was one of the two Type IA ocean-going U-boats produced by Nazi Germany's Kriegsmarine. Constructed in Bremen, U-26 was commissioned in May 1936. She experienced a short, but successful combat career, sinking eleven ships.

Until 1940, U-26 was primarily used as training vessel and for propaganda purposes by the German government. During her trials it was found that the Type IA submarine was difficult to handle due to her poor stability and slow dive rate.

In early 1940, the boat was called into combat duty due to the shortage of available submarines. U-26 participated in six war patrols, sinking eleven ships and badly damaging one other. On her first patrol laying mines, U-26 sank three merchant ships and damaged one British warship. On her second war patrol she became the first U-boat during World War II to enter the Mediterranean Sea. U-26 participated in three other successful patrols, sinking four additional merchant ships.

== Construction history ==
Laid down by DeSchiMAG AG Weser in Bremen as yard number 904 on 1 August 1935, U-26 was launched on 14 March 1936. She was commissioned on 6 May with Kapitänleutnant Werner Hartmann in command.

== Operational history ==
U-26 carried out six patrols between August 1939 and July 1940, during which she sank or damaged 12 ships.

=== First patrol ===
U-26 was one of the first group of German submarines deployed to the Atlantic Ocean prior to the German invasion of Poland. Oberkommando der Marine (OKM) had ordered her loaded with mines and to be ready to put in place a minefield in Portland Harbour. Upon her completion of refit on 28 August, she put to sea with a load of mines and six torpedoes, under the command of Klaus Ewerth. U-26 was positioned off of the western end of the English Channel awaiting final orders. She was deemed unfit for combat duties but was none-the-less to stand ready to engage shipping with torpedoes upon completion of mining operations. OKM conceived of the mission to deny the British a port of embarkation for transporting the British Army to France, but Karl Dönitz opposed the mission as too risky as the port was a major Royal Navy base, including their sonar school, and thus the harbor was bound to be well defended by antisubmarine forces.

With the war underway, on 4 September, U-26 began to penetrate the harbour but was slowed by antisubmarine patrols which were intense, as Dönitz had feared, and forced the first two attempts to be aborted. It was not until four days later, on his third attempt, that Ewerth found a good position, known as the Shambles, to deploy his TMB mines. After laying all the carried mines, he escaped to deeper water where the crew rested and loaded the six torpedoes in order to continue the patrol. While moving westward, U-26 was hounded by British anti-submarine forces, preventing the boat's resumption of communications. The Admiralty had claimed the sinking of a mine-laying U-boat on 8 September and attempts to contact U-26 went unanswered, leading Dönitz to fear that U-26 and her valuable Enigma machine may have been sunk in shallow waters from which they may be recovered by the British. Consequently, orders were put out by OKM to change all Enigma settings and thereafter that mine-laying boats were not to carry Enigma. U-26 however evaded the British forces and successfully reached the open Atlantic from which she was able to report her success to Dönitz.<

While mine-laying was generally disliked by submariners for many reasons, this first minefield laid by U-boats in the war actually yielded a handsome return. Three freighters totaling 17,414 tons were sunk (one each of Greek, Belgian, and Dutch nationality) and the corvette HMS Kittiwake was damaged severely, though this last result was successfully kept from the Germans.

=== Fate ===
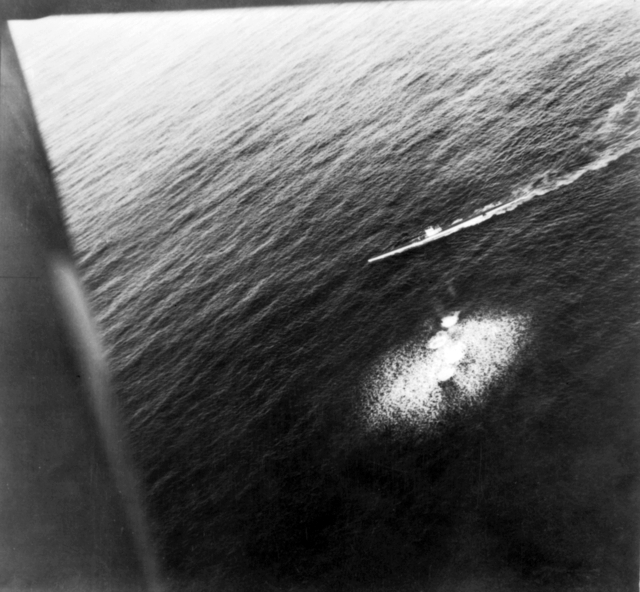
U-26 under attack by a Sunderland flying boat on 1 July 1940.

The boat was scuttled southwest of Ireland after being badly damaged by depth charges dropped by the British Flower-class corvette HMS Gladiolus and an Australian Sunderland flying boat of No. 10 Squadron RAAF. The crew (48 men), all survived. However, 6 of them were killed on 22 July 1940, along with 2 British servicemen, when a Heinkel He 111 of Kampfgeschwader 26 jettisoned its remaining bombs when returning from an inshore anti-shipping sortie and accidentally hit POW Camp 5 at Duff House, Banff, Scotland.

== Summary of raiding history ==
Date	Name	Nationality	Tonnage (GRT)	Fate
15 September 1939	Alex van Opstal	Belgium	5,965	Sunk (mine)
7 October 1939	Binnendijk	Netherlands	6,873	Sunk (mine)
13 November 1939	Loire	France	4,285	Sunk
22 November 1939	Elena R.	Greece	4,576	Sunk (mine)
12 February 1940	Nidarholm	Norway	3,482	Sunk
14 February 1940	Langleeford	United Kingdom	4,622	Sunk
15 February 1940	Steinstad	Norway	2,477	Sunk
21 April 1940	Cedarbank	United Kingdom	5,159	Sunk
26 June 1940	Frangoula B. Goulandris	Greece	6,701	Sunk
30 June 1940	Belmoira	Norway	3,214	Sunk
30 June 1940	Merkur	Estonia	1,291	Sunk
1 July 1940	Zarian	United Kingdom	4,871	Damaged

== Fictional portrayal ==
A Type VIIC U-boat (not a Type I) with the number U-26 is seen in the 1981 film Raiders of the Lost Ark. The boat was a seaworthy mockup of the actual U-96 built for the 1981 West German war film Das Boot. Both movies were filming at the same time in La Rochelle and its U-boat pens. One morning the Das Boat production crew arrived and found 'U-96' missing. The prop company had failed to mention that American filmmaker Steven Spielberg had hired her for a week to portray U-26 in his film.

== Bibliography ==
- Blair, Clay (1996). Hitler's U-Boat War: The Hunters, 1939-1942. ISBN 0394588398.
- Busch, Rainer; Röll, Hans-Joachim (1999). German U-boat commanders of World War II : a biographical dictionary. Translated by Brooks, Geoffrey. London, Annapolis, MD: Greenhill Books, Naval Institute Press. ISBN 1-55750-186-6.
- Busch, Rainer; Röll, Hans-Joachim (1999). Der U-Boot-Krieg, 1939-1945: Deutsche U-Boot-Verluste von September 1939 bis Mai 1945 [German U-boat losses from September 1939 to May 1945] (in German). Vol. IV. Hamburg, Berlin, Bonn: Mittler. ISBN 3-8132-0514-2.
- Gröner, Eric; Jung, Dieter; Maass, Martin (1991). German Warships 1815-1945: U-boats and Mine Warfare Vessels. Vol. 2. Translated by Thomas, Keith; Magowan, Rachel. London: Conway Maritime. ISBN 0-85177-593-4.
- Williamson, Gordon (2005). Wolf Pack: The Story of the U-Boat in World War II. Oxford: Osprey. ISBN 9781841768724.
