= Waterford Union Workhouse =

Former workhouse in Waterford, Ireland

The Waterford Union Workhouse was a workhouse built in 1839–41 on a six-acre site to the south of Waterford in Ireland.

== History ==
The Waterford Poor Law Union was established under the Poor Law Amendment Act 1834 in 1838, and covered an area of 230 square miles. During this period in Ireland, the country was divided into poor law unions which each had a workhouse. The establishment of workhouses in Poor Law Unions assured that only those in the deepest of destitution could avail of ‘indoor relief’.

The Waterford Union Workhouse was designed by George Wilkinson, and was constructed at a cost of £7,850, to hold 900 inmates. The workhouse in Waterford City was constructed to serve a 'union' area made up of East Waterford and South Kilkenny. The workhouse was declared fit for the admission of paupers on 15 March 1841, and the first inmates entered the workhouse on 20 April.

By November 1846, the capacity at the Waterford Union Workhouse was almost full. A statement dating from 1 May 1847 shows the amount of workhouse accommodation in Ireland. The statement claims that the Waterford Union Workhouse was originally designed for 900 inmates, but that additional sleeping galleries and sheds had been provided for 200 inmates.

The workhouse took advantage of two institutions which were located nearby, the Waterford County and City Infirmary and the Fever Hospital. In January 1847, permission was granted to develop the workhouse, which included a hospital.

== Life at the Waterford Union Workhouse ==
The Waterford Union Workhouse is described as a place of great destitution and misery. It was said at the time that paupers avoided the Waterford workhouse, and instead opted for the New Ross or Dungarvan workhouse. By 1848, the workhouse was overcrowded, and disease was rife. The Waterford Mail reported on 5 April 1848 that the workhouse was "Crowded to suffication. Sixty four died during the last fortnight; they were dying like rotten sheep".

On arrival to the Waterford Union Workhouse, applicants were ‘tested’ by a committee made up of a relieving officer and two guardians to judge their destitution. If applicants passed the criteria for admittance, they were stripped and given workhouse clothes. Only mothers who were nursing were allowed to keep their infants. Work was required of adults who were deemed capable of it. According to a report of the Waterford Union Workhouse by Inspector Burke, it proved more difficult for men to be resourcefully employed at the workhouse. Burke writes some male inmates could be found wandering around the town, and the majority were in a shed in the men’s yard which was overcrowded.

Two schools were provided for children in the Waterford Union Workhouse. The Relief Commission Papers for July 1847 state that the boys' school at the Waterford Union Workhouse is well constructed, however, the female school is not the same degree of efficiency and no rolls have been kept by the schoolmistress. Disciplinary actions towards inmates at the Waterford Union Workhouse are recorded as being conducted through the implementing of a restricted diet. Those who misbehaved were given three meals of bread a day for three days, which were to be eaten in isolation.

== Waterford Union Workhouse post famine ==
The medical care of the Waterford Union Workhouse was passed over to the responsibility of the religious order, the Sisters of Mercy in September 1876. The workhouse became St. Patrick's County Hospital following the creation of the Irish Free State in 1921. From 1921, poor relief was relocated to the County Home in Dungarvan in West Waterford. Since 1958, St. Patrick's County Hospital has been focused on geriatric care.
