= HMS Icarus (D03) =

Destroyer of the Royal Navy

History

United Kingdom
- Name: Icarus
- Builder: John Brown and Company, Clydebank, Scotland
- Laid down: 9 March 1936
- Launched: 26 November 1936
- Commissioned: 1 May 1937
- Decommissioned: 29 August 1946
- Identification: Pennant number: D03
- Motto: Bene est tentare; ("It is as well to try")
- Fate: Scrapped, 1946
- Badge: On a Field Blue, a sun in splendour Proper above two wings White

General characteristics (as built)
- Class & type: I-class destroyer
- Displacement: 1,370 long tons (1,390 t) (standard); 1,888 long tons (1,918 t) (deep load)
- Length: 323 ft (98.5 m)
- Beam: 33 ft (10.1 m)
- Draught: 12 ft 6 in (3.8 m)
- Installed power: 3 Admiralty 3-drum boilers; 34,000 shp (25,000 kW)
- Propulsion: 2 shafts, 2 geared steam turbines
- Speed: 35.5 knots (65.7 km/h; 40.9 mph)
- Range: 5,500 nmi (10,200 km; 6,300 mi) at 15 knots (28 km/h; 17 mph)
- Complement: 145
- Sensors & processing systems: ASDIC
- Armament: 4 × single 4.7 in (120 mm) guns; 2 × quadruple 0.5-inch (12.7 mm) machine guns; 2 × quintuple 21 in (533 mm) torpedo tubes; 1 × rack and 2 throwers for 16 depth charges; 60 mines

Service record
- Commanders: Colin Maud
- Operations: North Sea 1939; Atlantic 1939–44; Narvik 1940; Norway 1940–41; Dunkirk 1940; Bismarck Action 1941; Arctic 1941–43; Malta Convoys 1942; Normandy 1944; English Channel 1945
- Victories: Sank U-45, U-35 (1939), U-744 (1944), U-1199 (1945)

HMS Icarus was one of nine I-class destroyers built for the Royal Navy during the 1930s.

== Description ==
The I-class ships were improved versions of the preceding H-class. They displaced 1,370 long tons (1,390 t) at standard load and 1,888 long tons (1,918 t) at deep load. The ships had an overall length of 323 feet (98.5 m), a beam of 33 feet (10.1 m) and a draught of 12 feet 6 inches (3.8 m). They were powered by two Parsons geared steam turbines, each driving one propeller shaft, using steam provided by three Admiralty three-drum boilers. The turbines developed a total of 34,000 shaft horsepower (25,000 kW) and were intended to give a maximum speed of 35.5 knots (65.7 km/h; 40.9 mph). Icarus only reached a speed of 35.1 knots (65.0 km/h; 40.4 mph) from 33,380 shp (24,890 kW) during her sea trials. The ships carried enough fuel oil to give them a range of 5,500 nautical miles (10,200 km; 6,300 mi) at 15 knots (28 km/h; 17 mph). Their crew numbered 145 officers and ratings.

The ships mounted four 4.7-inch (120 mm) Mark IX guns in single mounts, designated 'A', 'B', 'X' and 'Y' from bow to stern. For anti-aircraft (AA) defence, they had two quadruple mounts for the 0.5 inch Vickers Mark III machine gun. The I class was fitted with two above-water quintuple torpedo tube mounts for 21-inch (533 mm) torpedoes. One depth charge rack and two throwers were fitted; 16 depth charges were originally carried, but this increased to 35 shortly after the war began. Icarus was one of the four I-class destroyers fitted with minelaying equipment in late 1938 – January 1939 at Malta. This consisted of mounts for rails on the deck on which to carry the mines and an electric winch to move the mines down the rails. A pair of sponsons were added to the stern to allow the mines to clear the propellers when dropped into the sea. 'A' and 'Y' guns and both sets of torpedo tubes were modified to allow them to be removed to compensate for the weight of the mines. The ships could carry a maximum of 72 mines. The I-class ships were fitted with the ASDIC sound detection system to locate submarines underwater.

== Construction and career ==
=== Service 1939-40 ===
On 29 November 1939, Icarus sighted the German submarine U-35 between the Shetland Islands and Bergen (Norway), but was unable to launch an effective attack because her ASDIC (sonar) was out of commission. Fellow destroyers Kingston and Kashmir were called to the scene, and Icarus departed. Kingston was able to launch a successful depth charge attack, forcing the U-boat to surface and scuttle itself.

Icarus participated in the Norwegian campaign in 1940, first capturing the 8,514 ton German supply ship Alster (brought to the United Kingdom and renamed Empire Endurance) on 11 April and then taking part in the Second Battle of Narvik on 13 April 1940.

She participated in Operation Dynamo, the evacuation from Dunkirk in late May and early June 1940.

=== Bismarck breakout ===
In early May 1941, the British Admiralty was on the alert that the Bismarck might attempt to break out into the North Atlantic, so Icarus was ordered to Scapa Flow for possible deployment against the Germans. On 22 May, just after midnight, Icarus sailed along with the destroyers Achates, Antelope, Anthony, Echo, and Electra, escorting the battlecruiser Hood and the battleship Prince of Wales to cover the northern approaches. The intention was that the force would refuel in Hvalfjord, Iceland, and then sail again to watch the Denmark Strait.

On the evening of 23 May, the weather deteriorated. At 20:55 hrs., Admiral Lancelot Holland aboard Hood signalled the destroyers "If you are unable to maintain this speed I will have to go on without you. You should follow at your best speed." At 02:15 on the morning of 24 May, the destroyers were ordered to spread out at 15 miles (24 km) intervals to search to the north. At about 05:35, the German forces were sighted by Hood, and shortly after, the Germans sighted the British ships. Firing commenced at 05:52. At 06:01, Hood suffered a direct hit from a 38 centimetres (15 in) shell from Bismarck, possibly striking one of the aft magazines. The ship was wracked by a colossal explosion, sinking the ship within 2 minutes. Electra and the other destroyers were about 60 miles (97 km) away at the time.

Upon hearing that Hood had sunk, Electra raced to the area, arriving about two hours after Hood went down. They were expecting to find many survivors, and rigged scrambling nets and heaving lines, and placed life belts on the deck where they could be quickly thrown in. From the 94 officers and 1,321 ratings aboard Hood, just three survivors were found. Electra rescued them, and continued searching. Shortly thereafter, Icarus and Anthony joined in the search, and the three ships searched the area for more survivors. No more were found, only driftwood, debris, and a desk drawer filled with documents. After several hours searching, they left the area.

=== Later service ===
She participated in Operation Pedestal, escorting a convoy to Malta in August 1942.

Icarus was involved in many important events of the Second World War, Dunkirk, Spitzbergen, and numerous Atlantic and Russian convoys.

Icarus sank four German U-boats:

- On 14 October 1939 she participated in sinking of U-45 in the Western Approaches with destroyers Inglefield, Ivanhoe and Intrepid.
- On 29 November 1939 U-35 was scuttled by its crew in the North Sea, after a depth charge attack from Icarus, Kingston and Kashmir. All 43 hands on board survived.
- On 6 March 1944 she sank U-744 while in company with the corvette Kenilworth Castle, the Canadian frigate St. Catharines, corvettes Fennel and Chilliwack and destroyers Chaudiere and Gatineau in the North Atlantic.
- On 21 January 1945 she sank U-1199 while in company with the corvette Mignonette in the English Channel near the Isles of Scilly.

A long-time captain of Icarus, Colin Maud, was the Juno beach master at the D-day landings; in the film The Longest Day, he was played by Kenneth More, complete with bulldog.

Lieutenant-Commander John Simon Kerans, famous for his part in sailing HMS Amethyst, down the Yangtze River, a feat made famous in the film Yangtse Incident, also served in Icarus as "number one".

Icarus was paid off on 29 August 1946, handed over to the British Iron & Steel Corporation on 29 October 1946 and broken up at Troon in Scotland.

== Bibliography ==
- Colledge, J. J.; Warlow, Ben (2006) [1969]. Ships of the Royal Navy: The Complete Record of All Fighting Ships of the Royal Navy from the 15th Century to the Present (3rd Rev ed.). London: Chatham Publishing. ISBN 978-1-86176-281-8. OCLC 67375475.
- Crabb, Brian James (2014). Operation Pedestal: The story of Convoy WS21S in August 1942. England: Shaun Tyas. ISBN 978-1-907730-19-1.
- English, John (1993). Amazon to Ivanhoe: British Standard Destroyers of the 1930s. Kendal, England: World Ship Society. ISBN 0-905617-64-9.
- Friedman, Norman (2006). British Destroyers & Frigates: The Second World War and After. Annapolis, Maryland: Naval Institute Press. ISBN 1-86176-137-6.
- Haarr, Geirr H. (2010). The Battle for Norway: April–June 1940. Barnsley, UK: Seaforth Publishing. ISBN 978-1-84832-057-4.
- Haarr, Geirr H. (2009). The German Invasion of Norway, April 1940. Annapolis, Maryland: Naval Institute Press. ISBN 978-1-59114-323-9.
- Hodges, Peter & Friedman, Norman (1979). Destroyer Weapons of World War 2. Greenwich: Conway Maritime Press. ISBN 978-0-85177-137-3.
- Lenton, H. T. (1998). British & Empire Warships of the Second World War. Annapolis, Maryland: Naval Institute Press. ISBN 1-55750-048-7.
- March, Edgar J. (1966). British Destroyers: A History of Development, 1892-1953; Drawn by Admiralty Permission From Official Records & Returns, Ships' Covers & Building Plans. London: Seeley Service. OCLC 164893555.
- Rohwer, Jürgen (2005). Chronology of the War at Sea 1939–1945: The Naval History of World War Two (Third Revised ed.). Annapolis, Maryland: Naval Institute Press. ISBN 1-59114-119-2.
- Smith, Peter C. (2005). Into the Minefields: British Destroyer Minelaying 1918–1980. Barnsley, UK: Pen & Sword Books. ISBN 1-84415-271-5.
- Whitley, M. J. (1988). Destroyers of World War Two: An International Encyclopedia. Annapolis, Maryland: Naval Institute Press. ISBN 0-87021-326-1.
- Winser, John de S. (1999). B.E.F. Ships Before, At and After Dunkirk. Gravesend, Kent: World Ship Society. ISBN 0-905617-91-6.
