= HMS Kashmir (F12) =

Destroyer of the Royal Navy

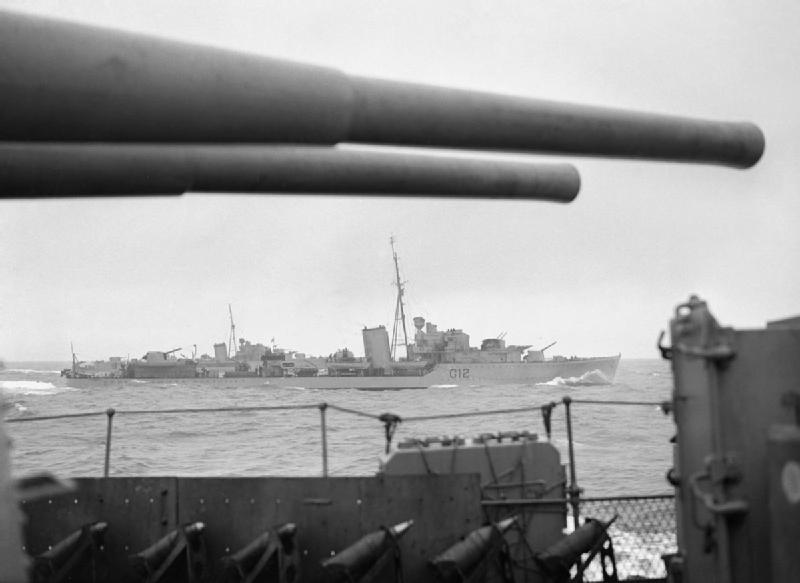
- HMS Kashmir

History

United Kingdom
- Name: HMS Kashmir
- Builder: Thornycroft, Southampton
- Laid down: October 1937
- Launched: 4 April 1939
- Commissioned: 26 October 1939
- Identification: Pennant number: F12
- Fate: Bombed and sunk, 23 May 1941

General characteristics (as built)
- Class & type: K-class destroyer
- Displacement: 1,690 long tons (1,720 t) (standard); 2,330 long tons (2,370 t) (deep load)
- Length: 356 ft 6 in (108.66 m) o/a
- Beam: 35 ft 9 in (10.90 m)
- Draught: 12 ft 6 in (3.81 m) (deep)
- Installed power: 44,000 shp (33,000 kW); 2 × Admiralty 3-drum boilers
- Propulsion: 2 × shafts; 2 × geared steam turbines
- Speed: 36 knots (67 km/h; 41 mph)
- Range: 5,500 nmi (10,200 km; 6,300 mi) at 15 knots (28 km/h; 17 mph)
- Complement: 183 (218 for flotilla leaders)
- Sensors & processing systems: ASDIC
- Armament: 3 × twin 4.7 in (120 mm) guns; 1 × quadruple 2 pdr (40 mm (1.6 in) AA guns; 2 × quadruple 0.5 in (12.7 mm) anti-aircraft machineguns; 2 × quintuple 21 in (533 mm) torpedo tubes; 1 × rack, 2 × throwers for depth charges

HMS Kashmir (F12) was a K-class destroyer built for the Royal Navy during the 1930s, named after the princely state of Kashmir in British India.

== Description ==
The K-class destroyers were repeats of the preceding J class, except that they were not fitted for minesweeping gear. They displaced 1,690 long tons (1,720 t) at standard load and 2,330 long tons (2,370 t) at deep load. The ships had an overall length of 339 feet 6 inches (103.5 m), a beam of 35 feet (10.7 m) and a draught of 9 feet (2.7 m). They were powered by Parsons geared steam turbines, each driving one propeller shaft, using steam provided by two Admiralty three-drum boilers. The turbines developed a total of 40,000 shaft horsepower (30,000 kW) and gave a maximum speed of 36 knots (67 km/h; 41 mph). The ships carried a maximum of 484 long tons (492 t) of fuel oil that gave them a range of 5,500 nautical miles (10,200 km; 6,300 mi) at 15 knots (28 km/h; 17 mph). The ship's complement was 183 officers and men.

The ships were armed with six 4.7-inch (120 mm) Mark XII guns in twin mounts, two superfiring in front of the bridge and one aft of the superstructure. For anti-aircraft (AA) defence, they had one quadruple mount for 2-pounder "pom-pom" guns and two quadruple mounts for the 0.5 inch Vickers Mark III anti-aircraft machinegun. The K-class ships were fitted with two above-water quintuple mounts for 21-inch (533 mm) torpedoes. The ship was fitted with two depth charge throwers and one rack for 20 depth charges.

== Construction and career ==
Kashmir was laid down by Thornycroft in Southampton in October 1937, launched on 4 April 1939 and commissioned on 26 October 1939.

In company with the destroyers Kingston and Icarus, Kashmir attacked the German submarine U-35 in the North Sea on 29 November 1939, forcing the U-boat to scuttle.

Kashmir was bombed and sunk on 23 May 1941 by German Stuka dive bombers belonging to StG 2 and led by Hubertus Hitschhold, south of Crete in position 34°40′N 24°10′E.
