= TMB and TMSB series mines =

Anti-tank mines

The TMB-1,TMB-2, and TMSB were a round Soviet minimum metal anti-tank mines used during the Second World War. Both mines were similar in design, differing only in size, with the TMB-2 being the larger.

The mines bodies were constructed from asphalt impregnated cardboard with internal wooden slats for strengthening. A central glass pressure plug sat over an MV-5 pressure fuse. Downward force of about 26 pounds (115 newtons) causes the case to give way, triggering the mine.

The mine was normally employed in minefields mixed with metal-cased anti-tank mines. The mines were also easy to fit with anti-handling devices.

== Specifications ==
	TMB-1	TMB-2	TMSB
Diameter	10 5/8 inches (270 mm)	10 3/4 inches (270 mm)	11 2/8 inches (290 mm)
Height	5 1/4 inches (130 mm)	6 inches (150 mm)	6 5/8 inches (170 mm)
Weight	14.5 lb (6.6 kg)	15.4 lb (7.0 kg)	17.6 lb (8.0 kg)
Explosive content	11 lb (5.0 kg) of Amatol with a 50 gram booster charge.	11 lb (5.0 kg) of Amatol with a 75 gram booster charge	13 lb (5.9 kg)
