= U80 =

U80 may refer to:

- German submarine U-80, various vessels
- HMIS Hindustan (U80), a sloop of the Royal Indian Navy
- Small nucleolar RNA SNORD80, a small nucleolar RNA
- Uppland Runic Inscription 80
- U80, a planned line of the Düsseldorf Stadtbahn
