= German submarine U-139 =

U-139 may refer to one of the following German submarines:

- SM U-139, the lead ship of the Type U 139 submarines; launched in 1917 and that served in the First World War until surrendered on 24 November 1918; became French submarine Halbronn until 24 July 1935; broken up
  - During the First World War, Germany also had this submarine with a similar name:
    - SM UB-139, a Type UB III submarine laid down but unfinished at the end of the war; broken up on the slip in 1919
- German submarine U-139 (1940), a Type IID submarine that served in the Second World War until scuttled on 2 May 1945; wreck broken up at later date
