= Lauzemis =

Lauzemis is a surname. Notable people with the surname include:

- Albert Lauzemis (1918–1944), German U-boat commander in World War II
- Lena Lauzemis (born 1983), German actress
