= Karl-Friedrich Merten =

German U-boat commander

- Born: 15 August 1905; Posen, German Empire
- Died: 2 May 1993 (aged 87); Waldshut-Tiengen, Germany
- Burial place: Cemetery in Waldshut-Tiengen
- Military career
- Allegiance: Weimar Republic; Nazi Germany
- Branch: Reichsmarine; Kriegsmarine
- Service years: 1928–1945
- Rank: Kapitän zur See (Captain at Sea)
- Units: SSS Niobe; Emden; Elsass; Schleswig-Holstein; Bremse; Königsberg; Karlsruhe; Leipzig; U-38; 2nd U-boat Flotilla
- Commands: escort ship F-7; U-68; 26th U-boat Flotilla; 24th U-boat Flotilla
- Conflicts: Spanish Civil War World War II: Battle of Westerplatte; Battle of Hel; Operation Weserübung; Battle of the Atlantic
- Awards: Knight's Cross of the Iron Cross with Oak Leaves

Karl-Friedrich Merten (15 August 1905 – 2 May 1993) commanded the U-boat U-68 in Nazi Germany's Kriegsmarine during World War II. He received the Knight's Cross of the Iron Cross with Oak Leaves. Merten was credited with the sinking of 27 ships for a total of 170,151 gross register tons (GRT) of Allied shipping. Merten joined the Reichsmarine (navy of the Weimar Republic) in 1926. He served on the light cruisers Karlsruhe and Leipzig during the Spanish Civil War patrols.

At the outbreak of World War II, he was stationed on the battleship Schleswig-Holstein, participating in the Battle of Westerplatte and Battle of Hel. He transferred to the U-boat Arm in 1940, at first serving as a watch officer on U-38 before taking command of U-68 in early 1941. Commanding U-68 on five war patrols, patrolling in the Atlantic Ocean, the Caribbean Sea and the Indian Ocean, he was awarded Knight's Cross of the Iron Cross on 13 June 1942 and the Oak Leaves to his Knight's Cross on 16 November 1942. On the second patrol, Merten helped rescue the crews of the auxiliary cruiser Atlantis and the refuelling ship Python, which had been sunk by the Royal Navy. In January 1943 Merten became the commander of the 26th U-boat Flotilla and in March 1943, Merten was given command of the 24th U-boat Flotilla. In February 1945, he was posted to the Führer Headquarters in Berlin. At the end of the war, he was taken prisoner of war by US forces and released again in late June 1945.

After the war, Merten worked in salvaging sunken ships in the Rhine river. In November 1948, Merten was arrested by the French and accused of allegedly wrongful sinking of the French tanker Frimaire in June 1942. He was acquitted and later worked in the shipbuilding industry. Merten, who had written his memoir and books on U-boat warfare, died of cancer on 2 May 1993 in Waldshut-Tiengen, Germany.

== Early life and career ==
Merten was born on 15 August 1905 in Posen, in the Prussian Province of Posen in the German Empire, present-day Poznań, Poland. His father was Dr. jur. Karl-Friedrich Merten, who in 1910 became the mayor of Elbing, present day Elbląg. In 1934, he was forced out of office when he refused to join the Nazi Party. Merten had a sister and a brother, both died before he had turned seven. His younger brother Klaus, as a Feldwebel (staff sergeant) in a pioneer platoon, died in 1942 of wounds sustained on the Eastern Front. Aged thirteen, Merten joined the Königliches Preußisches Kadettenhaus (Royal Prussian Cadet House) in Köslin, present-day Koszalin, on 1 April 1918. Following World War I, the cadet house was transformed into a state-run boarding school. There, he attended the school from 1920–26 and graduated with his Abitur (university entry qualification) on 20 March 1926.

He joined the Reichsmarine on 1 April 1926 as a member of "Crew 26" (the incoming class of 1926). (Note: The German Reichsmarine which was renamed the Kriegsmarine on 1 June 1935.) He underwent basic military training with the 5th company of the 2nd department of the standing ship division of the Baltic Sea on the Dänholm in Stralsund. (Note: 5th company—5. Kompanie) (Note: 2nd battalion—II. Abteilung) (Note: standing ship division—Schiffsstammdivision) Merten was then transferred to the training ship Niobe (12 July – 17 October 1926), attaining the rank of Seekadett (officer cadet) on 12 October 1926. Following a 17-month stay on board the cruiser Emden (18 October 1926 – 24 March 1928), he advanced in rank to Fähnrich zur See (midshipman) on 1 April 1928.

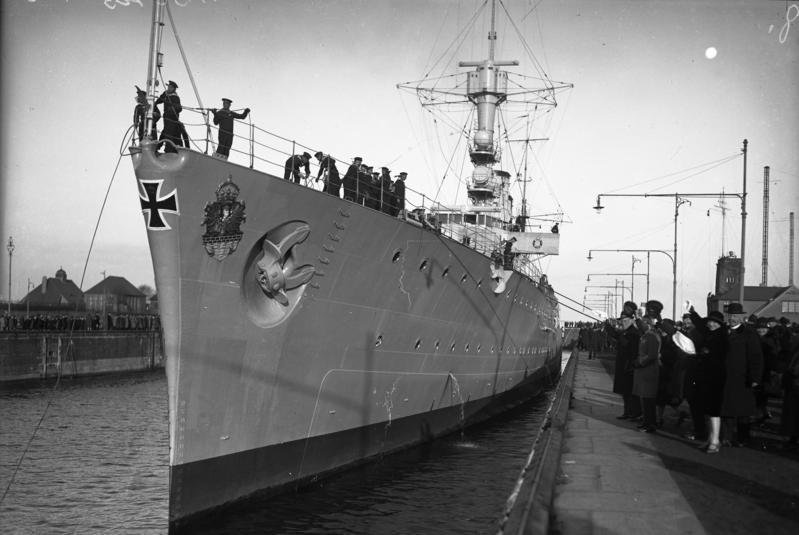
Emden in port, in 1928

Merten sailed on Emden's first training cruise, which began on 14 November 1926 and started in Wilhelmshaven. The journey took him and her crew around Africa to Indonesia and the Cocos Islands where SMS Emden was lost on 9 November 1914. There the crew held a commemoration on 15 March 1927. The journey then continued to Japan and Alaska down the west coast of North and South America, around Cape Horn. They celebrated Christmas and New Year's Day in Rio de Janeiro. From there they headed to Middle America and the Azores. Their final stopover was Vilagarcía de Arousa, Spain before they returned home on 14 March 1928.

Following his journey on Emden, Merten attended the main cadet course at the Naval Academy at Mürwik (25 March 1928 – 22 March 1929). (Note: main cadet course—Hauptlehrgang für Fähnriche) This course was briefly interrupted for two navigational training courses, the first on the tender Nordsee (9–13 July 1928) and the second on the survey vessel Meteor (8–13 October 1928). He then underwent a number of specialized training courses which included a torpedo course in Mürwik (23 March – 1 June 1929), (Note: torpedo course for cadets—Torpedolehrgang für Fähnriche) a communication course for cadets at Mürwik again (2 June – 6 July 1929), (Note: communication course for cadets—Nachrichtenlehrgang für Fähnriche) a pathfinder course for cadets at Kiel (7 July – 4 August 1929), (Note: mine warfare course for cadets—Sperrlehrgang für Fähnriche) a naval infantry course for cadets with the 8th company of the 2nd battalion of the standing ship division at Stralsund (5 August – 27 October 1929), (Note: infantry course for cadets—Infanterielehrgang für Fähnriche) and lastly an artillery course for cadets at Kiel-Wik (28 October 1929 – 2 February 1930). (Note: artillery course for cadets—Artillerielehrgang für Fähnriche) Merten was then transferred to the battleship Elsass (3–24 February 1930) and Schleswig-Holstein (25 February – 22 September 1930) for further ship based training. On this assignment, he was promoted to Oberfähnrich zur See (Ensign) on 1 June 1930. His cadet mentor on Elsass and Schleswig-Holstein was Korvettenkapitän (Corvette Captain) Ernst Lindemann. (Note: cadet mentor—Fähnrichsvater) Lindemann later commanded the battleship Bismarck. Merten's next service position was a gunnery officer on the light cruiser Königsberg (23 September 1930 – 23 September 1931). There he was made an officer, attaining the rank Leutnant zur See (acting sub-lieutenant) on 1 October 1930. His stay on Königsberg was briefly interrupted for a gas protection course (6–16 January 1931). (Note: gas protection course—Gasschutzlehrgang)

For two years, Merten then became gunnery instructor at the Naval Artillery School in Kiel-Wik (24 September 1931 – 29 September 1933). During this timeframe, Merten himself attended an anti-aircraft artillery course at Wilhelmshaven (16 February – 12 May 1932), (Note: anti-aircraft artillery course—Fla-Waffenlehrgang) and an anti-aircraft artillery instructors course in Wilhelmshaven and on the tender Fuchs (11 October – 14 December 1932). On 15 December 1932, Merten was posted to the gunnery training ship Bremse, serving as 2nd artillery officer. After this assignment, which ended on 25 March 1933, he was promoted to Oberleutnant zur See (lieutenant (junior grade)) on 1 April 1933. In 1933, Merten first met his future wife, Ruth Oldenburg from Wiesbaden. At the time, she was a first semester medicine student at the University of Kiel. On 15 March 1934, the marriage approval was granted by Naval Personnel Office. (Note: Naval Personnel Office—Marineleitung/Marine-Personalamt) The two married on 21 April 1934 in Wiesbaden. The marriage resulted in the birth of a daughter, Karen-Helge, born on 11 June 1935, a son Karl-Friedrich Birger, born 15 March 1939, and another son, Jan, born February 1947.

For the next five months (30 September 1933 – 26 February 1934), Merten served as the artillery referent with the Commander of Minesweepers (F.d.M.). (Note: Commander of Minesweepers—Führer der Minensuchboote) In parallel to this assignment, he served as 2nd watch officer on the torpedo boat T-156 in the 2nd Minesweeper-Demi-Flotilla as well as Flag Lieutenant with the Commander of Scouting Forces (B.d.A.) on the fleet tender Hella (6–29 January 1934). (Note: 2nd Minesweeper-Demi-Flotilla—2. Minensuchhalbflottille) (Note: Commander of Scouting Forces—Befehlshaber der Aufklärungsstreitkräfte) He then posted to the anti-artillery training course at the Naval Coast Artillery School in Wilhelmshaven (27 February – 28 March 1934). He then transferred back to his former position of 2nd watch officer on torpedo boat T-156 (29 March – 30 September 1934), this posting was briefly interrupted by a transfer to the light cruiser Königsberg (8 July – 2 August 1934).

Merten was posted to the light cruiser Karlsruhe (21 September 1935 – 7 March 1937), serving as the 2nd artillery officer and watch officer. On 1 April 1936, Merten was promoted to Kapitänleutnant (captain lieutenant) and on 2 October 1936 received the Wehrmacht Long Service Award 4th Class, which had been created on 16 March 1936, for four years of military service. In back-to-back assignments, he was briefly transferred to the light cruiser Leipzig (8 March – 20 May 1937), serving as the anti-aircraft artillery officer, and then again on Karlsruhe (21 May – 11 June 1937). On Karlsruhe and Leipzig he participated in the Kriegsmarine's non-intervention patrols of the Spanish Civil War. For this service he received the Spanish Cross in Bronze on 20 April 1938. Merten led a Star sailing boat training course (21 July – 29 September 1937) and was then given command of the escort ship F-7 (30 September 1937 – 12 February 1939).

== World War II ==
From 1 March to 30 June 1939, Merten took an artillery officer's training course for battleship and was posted to Schleswig-Holstein in July 1939 as a cadet training officer. World War II began on 1 September 1939 when German forces invaded Poland. Merten participated in the bombardment of the Polish base at Danzig's Westerplatte in the early morning hours of 1 September 1939. On 7 September, he led Schleswig-Holstein's naval infantry troops in the Battle of Hel. Together with the 5. Marineartillerie-Abteilung (5th Naval Artillery Department), German troops landed on the Hel Peninsula. For his actions in these battles he received the Iron Cross 2nd Class (Eisernes Kreuz 2. Klasse) on 2 October 1939.

Merten volunteered for service with the U-boat arm in 1940. He attended his first U-boat training course with the torpedo school in Flensburg-Mürwik (29 April– 2 June 1940), followed by another course at the communications school, also in Flensburg-Mürwik (3–30 June 1940). He was then posted to the 1st U-boat Training Division (1 July – 29 September 1940), followed by a U-boat commander's course with the 24th U-boat Flotilla (30 September – 29 November 1940). On 30 November 1940, Merten was transferred to the 2nd U-boat Flotilla, joining the crew of Kapitänleutnant Heinrich Liebe's U-38 as a commander in training and watch officer. Merten went on one war patrol with U-38 (18 December 1940 – 22 January 1941). This was Liebe's eighth war patrol as a commander, during which two ships of 16,583 GRT were sunk.

=== U-boat commander and first patrol ===
On 24 January 1941, Merten was stationed at the DeSchiMAG AG Weser shipyard in Bremen, for familiarization with U-68. U-68 was a Type IXC U-boat, designed as a large ocean-going submarine for sustained operations far from the home support facilities. Merten commissioned U-68 on 11 February 1941 into the 2nd U-boat Flotilla. He took U-68 on five war patrols, patrolling in the Atlantic Ocean, the Caribbean Sea and the Indian Ocean. He surrendered command of U-68 on 18 January 1943 to Oberleutnant zur See Albert Lauzemis.

Merten's first patrol (30 June – 1 August 1941) was a transfer patrol into the northern Atlantic Ocean, taking U-68 from Kiel to Lorient in France. The patrol, taking U-68 into the North Atlantic, lasted 33 days and covered 6,416 nautical miles (11,882 kilometers; 7,383 miles) afloat and 97 nmi (180 km; 112 mi) submerged. His 1st watch officer on this patrol was Oberleutnant zur See August Maus, 2nd watch officer was Lauzemis. Merten did not sink any ships on this patrol.

During the first five days of this patrol, U-68 came under a depth charge attack and was almost rammed by a Royal Navy destroyer south of Iceland. Merten later attempted to torpedo strangler and came into contact with a British convoy, which he lost again without shooting a single torpedo. When the main bilge pump failed, which impeded the U-boats diving ability, Merten decided to abort the mission and headed for France. On the journey to France, the starboard diesel engine failed and a member of the crew fell ill with pneumonia. U-68 arrived in Lorient on 1 August 1940.

=== Second patrol, rescue of Allied crews ===
On the second patrol (11 September – 25 December 1941), Merten headed for the middle and southern Atlantic Ocean, the Ascension Island, to Saint Helena and Cape Verde. The patrol, taking U-68 into the South Atlantic, lasted 116 days and covered 17,481 nautical miles (32,375 kilometers; 20,117 miles) afloat and 119 nmi (220 km; 137 mi) submerged. During the course of this patrol, he was able to sink four ship totaling 23,697 GRT. On 22 September 1941, Merten torpedoed his first ship the 5,302 GRT British Steamer SS Silverbelle sailing in convoy SL-87. He also attacked the SS Niceto de Larrinage and the MV Edward Blyden. However U-103 und the command of Kapitänleutnant Werner Winter was credited with these sinkings. Off Saint Helena, Merten sank the British fleet oiler Darkdale on 22 October 1941. On 28 October 1941, U-68 sank SS Hazelside and the British motor merchant SS Bradford City on 1 November 1941.

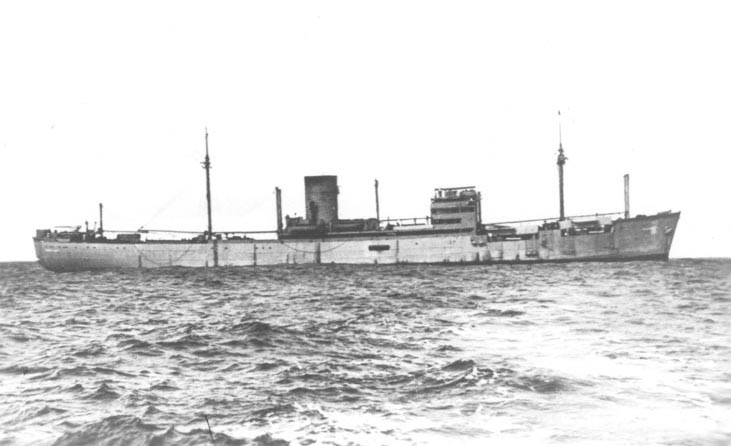
auxiliary cruiser Atlantis

On 13 November 1941, U-68 was resupplied by the auxiliary cruiser Atlantis under the command of Kapitän zur See Bernhard Rogge. The sea state was 6 to 7 at the meeting place, Rogge and Merten decided to move the meeting place 80 nautical miles (150 kilometers; 92 miles) southwest. The next day, they met again and provisions were transferred to U-68. During the following night, U-68 conducted a number of mock attacks on Atlantis for training purposes. On 23 November, U-68 received the message that Atlantis had been sunk by HMS Devonshire while resupplying U-126 under the command of Kapitänleutnant Ernst Bauer. U-126 was able to rescue up 300 German sailors, including Rogge. The Befehlshaber der Unterseeboote (BdU—supreme commander of the U-boat Arm) ordered U-124, under the command of Korvettenkapitän Johann Mohr, U-129, under the command of Kapitänleutnant Nicolai Clausen, and UA, under the command of Fregattenkapitän Hans Eckermann, to the rescue. Two days later the survivors were transferred to the refueling ship Python.

On 30 November, U-68 and UA met with Python for refueling. Immediately Merten and the crew began taking on fuel, 100 cubic meters (3,500 cubic feet) were transferred, as well as loading more torpedoes. UA was late to arrive, unnecessarily delaying the procedure. During the refueling, a smokestack was sighted, sounding the alarms. U-68 had just finished the transfer, but the additional weight of the boat was not yet accounted for, when Python came under attack from HMS Dorsetshire. U-68 was not ready for combat, Merten and the crew had difficulties keeping the boat at depth. During the vital phase of the attack U-68 was oscillating between a depth of 120 meters (390 feet) and 80 m (260 ft). Holding the boat at periscope depth was impossible. Submerged, the crew of U-68 could hear the sinking of Python. Following the first warning salvo by Dorsetshire, Python's crew its crew had chosen to scuttle the ship to avoid unnecessary casualties.

=== Third through fifth patrols ===
On U-68's third patrol (11 February – 13 April 1942), Merten sank seven ships of 39,350 GRT. The patrol, taking U-68 to the West African coast, lasted 60 days and covered 10,995 nautical miles (20,363 kilometers; 12,653 miles) afloat and 237 nmi (439 km; 273 mi) submerged. U-68 sank the SS Helenus on 3 March 1942, the SS Baluchistan on 8 March 1942, the SS Baron Newlands on 16 March 1942. On 17 March 1942, three ships, the SS Allende, the SS Ile de Batz and the SS Scottish Prince, were sunk. On 30 March 1942 the SS Muncaster Castle was hit by a two torpedoes south-southwest of Monrovia.

On Merten's fourth patrol (14 May – 10 July 1942), U-68 sank seven ships of 50,774 GRT. On this patrol, he was awarded the Knight's Cross of the Iron Cross (Ritterkreuz des Eisernen Kreuzes) on 13 June 1942. The patrol lasted 56 days and covered 11,495 nautical miles (21,289 kilometers; 13,228 miles) afloat and 190 nmi (350 km; 220 mi) submerged. U-68 sank the American steam tanker SS L.J. Drake and the Panamanian motor tanker MV C.O. Stillman, at the time the World's largest oil tanker, on 5 June 1942. On 10 June 1942, three ships, the SS Ardenvohr, the SS Port Montreal and the SS Surrey, were sunk. On 15 June 1942, Merten sank the Free French SS Frimaire which had legal consequences for him after the war. On 23 June 1942, the SS Arnaga was struck by a torpedo and later hit by artillery fire.

On U-68 fifth patrol (20 August – 6 December 1942), Merten operated in the U-boat wolf pack Eisbär (Polar Bear Group), consisting of four submarines, U-68 (Merten), U-156 (Werner Hartenstein), U-172 (Carl Emmermann), U-504 (Hans-Georg Friedrich Poske) a fifth U-boat, U-159 (Helmut Witte) joined the group later, which in the course of a few weeks during September–October 1942, sank more than 100,000 GRT of shipping off South Africa. The patrol, taking U-68 to and around South Africa into the Indian Ocean, lasted 108 days and covered 17,245 nautical miles (31,938 kilometers; 19,845 miles) afloat and 553 nmi (1,024 km; 636 mi) submerged. U-68 sank the SS Trevilley on 12 September 1942 and then later the SS Breedijk. On 8 October 1942, west of the Cape of Good Hope, four ships, the SS Gaasterkerk, the SS Koumoundouros, the SS Sarthe and the SS Swiftsure, were sunk. One day later, Merten sank the SS Belgian Fighter and the SS Examelia. On the 6 November 1942, on his return to Lorient, he ssnk his last ship the 8,034 GRT British Passenger Steamer SS City of Cairo, bringing his total to 27 ships of 170,151 GRT.

Cairo had been carrying 302 people, including 101 passengers, among them 29 women and 19 children (in addition to two stewardesses travelling as part of the crew). The ship sank in roughly 25 minutes, and when the second torpedo hit the liner, it capsized a lifeboat and smashed another, leaving women and children struggling in the water. Merten approached Boat 6, asking for the name, tonnage, and cargo of the ship, famously ending the conversation by saying, "Goodnight, sorry for sinking you". He pointed the survivors in the direction of the nearest land, St. Helena, which was more than 500 nmi (930 km; 580 mi) distant. Two lifeboats spent thirteen days at sea, another spent 14, one spent 36 and contained only three survivors, one spent 51 days and contained only 2 survivors. In the end, 107 of 302 people on board perished, including 4 of 31 women.

On this patrol, he was awarded the Knight's Cross of the Iron Cross with Oak Leaves (Ritterkreuz des Eisernen Kreuzes mit Eichenlaub) on 16 November 1942, the 147th officer or soldier of the Wehrmacht so honored. On 30 January 1943, Dönitz awarded Merten the U-boat War Badge with Diamonds (U-Boot-Kriegsabzeichen mit Brillanten). The presentation was made at the Hotel Kaiserhof in Berlin by Großadmiral Erich Raeder after the Oak Leaves presentation in Rastenburg. On 31 January 1943, Merten, Dönitz and other Kriegsmarine officers traveled to the Wolf's Lair, Hitler's headquarters in Rastenburg (now Kętrzyn in Poland) for the Oak Leaves presentation. Following the presentation, Hitler met with Dönitz and Vizeadmiral Theodor Krancke in private. In this meeting, Hitler appointed Dönitz as Oberbefehlshaber der Marine (Commander-in-Chief) of the Kriegsmarine following Raeder's resignation on 30 January 1943. On the return flight to Berlin, Dönitz informed Merten and the other officers present of this change in command.

=== Ashore ===
After his fifth war patrol, Merten was transferred to the 26th U-boat Flotilla (19 January – 28 February 1943) in Pillau, serving as deputy flotilla chief. On 1 March 1943, he was given command of the 24th U-boat Flotilla.

During his tenure with the 24th U-boat Flotilla, Merten was in frequent conflict with the Gauleiter of East Prussia, Erich Koch. In July 1944, Koch had ordered 6,000 untrained Hitler Youth boys to man the defensive positions around Memel, present-day Klaipėda, Lithuania, against the advancing Red Army. Merten evacuated the youngsters over the sea. Großadmiral (Grand Admiral) Karl Dönitz helped mitigate the situation with the furious Koch. In August 1944, Merten further evacuated 50,000 civilians with his flotilla.

On 12 March 1945, the 24th U-boat Flotilla was disbanded and Merten was posted to the Führer Headquarters in Berlin as a liaison officer. There he was put on the staff of Generalleutnant Rudolf Hübner's Fliegendes Sondergericht West (Flying Special Court-Martial West). This unit was created by Hitler in response to the American capture of the Ludendorff Bridge over the Rhine at Remagen. Although Merten joined this unit later, the Flying Special Court-Martial West was responsible for the death sentences of Major (Major) Hans Scheller, Major August Kraft and Major Herbert Strobel, as well as Hauptmann (Captain) Willi Oskar Bratge and Oberleutnant (First Lienutenant) Karl-Heinz Peters.

On 15 April 1945, he was promoted to Kapitän zur See (captain at sea). In late April 1945, Merten and other officers travelled to Upper Bavaria to the so-called Alpine Fortress. There, following the end of World War II in Europe, he was taken prisoner of war. From 25–29 June 1945, he was held in US captivity in Biessenhofen, Bavaria and released on 29 June 1945.

== Later life ==
In October 1948, Merten, who at the time lived in Wiesbaden and worked for the Wasserstraßen-Direktion Rheinland-Pfalz (Waterways Directorate Rhineland-Palatinate) salvaging sunken ships, was arrested by the French and accused of allegedly wrongful sinking of the French tanker Frimaire in June 1942. From 6 October 1948 until 8 March 1949, he was held in custody at the Cherche-Midi prison in Paris. The same prison Hermann-Bernhard Ramcke was awaiting his trial. Merten was acquitted on 10 September 1949. The Frimaire, which belonged to the Vichy government, had not been properly marked. Merten, among others, attended Karl Dönitz's funeral on 6 January 1981.

"We couldn't have been sunk by a nicer man"

— David Almond, survivor of the City of Cairo sinking

On 14 September 1984, a reunion of the survivors of City of Cairo was celebrated aboard HMS Belfast. The re-union was attended by 17 survivors and Merten and commemorated the publication of the book by Ralph Barker "Goodnight, Sorry for Sinking You".

In 1986, Merten and Kurt Baberg published their book Wir U-Bootfahrer sagen: "Nein!" "So war das nicht!" [We U-Boat Sailors say: "No!" "It was not like this!"]. (Note: Kurt Baberg (23 February 1917 – 31 March 2003) was a U-boat commander of U-30, U-618 and U-827. He was credited with the sinking of three ships and was awarded the German Cross in Gold on 14 January 1944 as Kapitänleutnant on U-618 in the 7th U-boat Flotilla.) This book criticizes Lothar-Günther Buchheim, especially his work Die U-Boot-Fahrer [U-Boat Sailors], for his anti-Dönitz demeanor.

On 1 January 1969, Merten started working for the Ingenieur Kontor Lübeck (IKL), headed by Ulrich Gabler, as a military-tactical advisor. He died of cancer on 2 May 1993 in Waldshut-Tiengen.

== Summary of career ==
As commander of U-68, Merten is credited with the sinking of 27 ships for a total of 170,151 gross register tons (GRT).

=== Awards ===
- Wehrmacht Long Service Award 4th Class & 3rd Class (2 October 1936)
- Olympic Games Decoration 2nd Class (21 December 1936)
- Spanish Cross in Bronze (20 April 1938)
- Sudetenland Medal (20 December 1939)
- Iron Cross (1939)
  - 2nd Class (2 October 1939)
  - 1st Class (30 December 1941)
- U-boat War Badge (1939) (2 August 1941) & with Diamonds (30 January 1943)
- High Seas Fleet Badge (9 October 1942)
- Knight's Cross of the Iron Cross with Oak Leaves
  - Knight's Cross on 13 June 1942 as Korvettenkapitän and commander of U-68
  - Oak Leaves on 16 November 1942 as Korvettenkapitän and commander of U-68
- War Merit Cross 1st Class with Swords
  - 2nd Class (30 January 1944)
  - 1st Class (29 October 1944)

=== Promotions ===
12 October 1926:	Seekadett (Officer Cadet)
1 April 1928:	Fähnrich zur See (Midshipman)
1 June 1930:	Oberfähnrich zur See (Ensign)
1 October 1930:	Leutnant zur See (Acting Sub-Lieutenant)
1 April 1933:	Oberleutnant zur See (Lieutenant (junior grade))
1 April 1936:	Kapitänleutnant (Captain Lieutenant)
1 April 1941:	Korvettenkapitän (Corvette Captain)>
1 January 1944:	Fregattenkapitän (Frigate Captain)
15 April 1945:	Kapitän zur See (Captain at Sea)

== Notes ==
Military offices
Preceded by Korvettenkapitän Hans-Gerrit von Stockhausen	Commander of 26th U-boat Flotilla; January 1943 – April 1943	Succeeded by Fregattenkapitan Helmut Brümmer-Patzig
Preceded by Kapitän zur See Rudolf Peters	Commander of 26th U-boat Flotilla; January 1943 – May 1944	Succeeded by Korvettenkapitän Karl Jasper
Preceded by Korvettenkapitän Karl Jasper	Commander of 26th U-boat Flotilla; July 1944 – March 1945	Succeeded by disbanded
