= German submarine U-80 =

U-80 may refer to one of the following German submarines:

- SM U-80, a Type UE I submarine launched in 1916 and that served in World War I until surrendered on 16 January 1919; broken up at Swansea in 1922
  - During World War I, Germany also had this submarine with a similar name:
    - SM UB-80, a Type UB III submarine launched in 1918 and surrendered on 26 November 1918; broken up at La Spezia in May 1919
- German submarine U-80, a Type VIIC submarine that served in World War II until sunk on 28 November 1944
