= German submarine U-393 =

German World War II submarine

History

Nazi Germany
- Name: U-393
- Ordered: 20 January 1941
- Builder: Howaldtswerke, Kiel
- Yard number: 25
- Laid down: 8 April 1942
- Launched: 15 May 1943
- Commissioned: 3 July 1943
- Fate: Scuttled on 5 May 1945 near the Fyn Islands in Flensburger Förde

General characteristics
- Class & type: Type VIIC submarine
- Displacement: 769 tonnes (757 long tons) surfaced; 871 t (857 long tons) submerged
- Length: 67.10 m (220 ft 2 in) o/a; 50.50 m (165 ft 8 in) pressure hull
- Beam: 6.20 m (20 ft 4 in) o/a; 4.70 m (15 ft 5 in) pressure hull
- Height: 9.60 m (31 ft 6 in)
- Draught: 4.74 m (15 ft 7 in)
- Installed power: 2,800–3,200 PS (2,100–2,400 kW; 2,800–3,200 bhp) (diesels); 750 PS (550 kW; 740 shp) (electric)
- Propulsion: 2 shafts; 2 × diesel engines; 2 × electric motors
- Speed: 17.7 knots (32.8 km/h; 20.4 mph) surfaced; 7.6 knots (14.1 km/h; 8.7 mph) submerged
- Range: 8,500 nmi (15,700 km; 9,800 mi) at 10 knots (19 km/h; 12 mph) surfaced; 80 nmi (150 km; 92 mi) at 4 knots (7.4 km/h; 4.6 mph) submerged
- Test depth: 230 m (750 ft); Crush depth: 250–295 m (820–968 ft)
- Complement: 4 officers, 40–56 enlisted
- Armament: 5 × 53.3 cm (21 in) torpedo tubes (four bow, one stern); 14 × torpedoes; 1 × 3.7 cm (1.5 in) Flak M42 AA gun; 2 × twin 2 cm (0.79 in) C/30 anti-aircraft guns

Service record
- Part of: 5th U-boat Flotilla; 3 July 1943 – 31 October 1944; 24th U-boat Flotilla; 1 November 1944 – 31 March 1945; 5th U-boat Flotilla; 1 April – 5 May 1945
- Identification codes: M 52 294
- Commanders: Oblt.z.S. Alfred Radermacher; 3 July 1943 – 30 September 1944; Oblt.z.S. Walter Zenker; 1 October 1944 – 13 January 1945; Oblt.z.S. Joachim Seeger; 14 January – April 1945; Oblt.z.S. Friedrich-Georg Herrle; April – 4 May 1945
- Operations: None
- Victories: None

German submarine U-393 was a Type VIIC U-boat of Nazi Germany's Kriegsmarine during World War II.

She did not carry out any patrols and did not sink or damage any ships.

She was scuttled on 5 May 1945 in Flensburger Förde.

== Design ==
German Type VIIC submarines were preceded by the shorter Type VIIB submarines. U-393 had a displacement of 769 tonnes (757 long tons) when at the surface and 871 tonnes (857 long tons) while submerged. She had a total length of 67.10 m (220 ft 2 in), a pressure hull length of 50.50 m (165 ft 8 in), a beam of 6.20 m (20 ft 4 in), a height of 9.60 m (31 ft 6 in), and a draught of 4.74 m (15 ft 7 in). The submarine was powered by two Germaniawerft F46 four-stroke, six-cylinder supercharged diesel engines producing a total of 2,800 to 3,200 metric horsepower (2,060 to 2,350 kW; 2,760 to 3,160 shp) for use while surfaced, two Garbe, Lahmeyer & Co. RP 137/c double-acting electric motors producing a total of 750 metric horsepower (550 kW; 740 shp) for use while submerged. She had two shafts and two 1.23 m (4 ft) propellers. The boat was capable of operating at depths of up to 230 metres (750 ft).

The submarine had a maximum surface speed of 17.7 knots (32.8 km/h; 20.4 mph) and a maximum submerged speed of 7.6 knots (14.1 km/h; 8.7 mph). When submerged, the boat could operate for 80 nautical miles (150 km; 92 mi) at 4 knots (7.4 km/h; 4.6 mph); when surfaced, she could travel 8,500 nautical miles (15,700 km; 9,800 mi) at 10 knots (19 km/h; 12 mph). U-393 was fitted with five 53.3 cm (21 in) torpedo tubes (four fitted at the bow and one at the stern), fourteen torpedoes, one 3.7 cm (1.5 in) Flak M42 and two twin 2 cm (0.79 in) C/30 anti-aircraft guns. The boat had a complement of between forty-four and sixty.

== Service history ==
The submarine was laid down on 8 April 1942 at the Howaldtswerke (yard) at Flensburg as yard number 25, launched on 15 May 1943 and commissioned on 3 July under the command of Oberleutnant zur See Alfred Radermacher.

She served with the 5th U-boat Flotilla from 3 July 1943 and the 24th flotilla as a trials vessel from 1 November 1944. She then came under the 5th flotilla once more from 1 April 1945.

=== Fate ===
U-393 was bombed by US aircraft in Geltinger Bucht on 4 May 1945. Two men were killed; there were an unknown number of survivors. She was scuttled the following day in the Flensburger Förde near the Fyn Islands.

== Bibliography ==
- Busch, Rainer; Röll, Hans-Joachim (1999). German U-boat commanders of World War II : a biographical dictionary. Translated by Brooks, Geoffrey. London, Annapolis, Md: Greenhill Books, Naval Institute Press. ISBN 1-55750-186-6.
- Busch, Rainer; Röll, Hans-Joachim (1999). Deutsche U-Boot-Verluste von September 1939 bis Mai 1945 [German U-boat losses from September 1939 to May 1945]. Der U-Boot-Krieg (in German). Vol. IV. Hamburg, Berlin, Bonn: Mittler. ISBN 3-8132-0514-2.
- Gröner, Erich; Jung, Dieter; Maass, Martin (1991). U-boats and Mine Warfare Vessels. German Warships 1815–1945. Vol. 2. Translated by Thomas, Keith; Magowan, Rachel. London: Conway Maritime Press. ISBN 0-85177-593-4.
