= German submarine U-351 =

German World War II submarine

History

Nazi Germany
- Name: U-351
- Ordered: 9 October 1939
- Builder: Flensburger Schiffbau-Gesellschaft, Flensburg
- Yard number: 470
- Laid down: 4 March 1940
- Launched: 27 March 1941
- Commissioned: 20 June 1941
- Fate: Scuttled, off northern Germany on 5 May 1945. Broken up in 1948

General characteristics
- Class & type: Type VIIC submarine
- Displacement: 769 tonnes (757 long tons) surfaced; 871 t (857 long tons) submerged
- Length: 67.10 m (220 ft 2 in) o/a; 50.50 m (165 ft 8 in) pressure hull
- Beam: 6.20 m (20 ft 4 in) o/a; 4.70 m (15 ft 5 in) pressure hull
- Height: 9.60 m (31 ft 6 in)
- Draught: 4.74 m (15 ft 7 in)
- Installed power: 2,800–3,200 PS (2,100–2,400 kW; 2,800–3,200 bhp) (diesels); 750 PS (550 kW; 740 shp) (electric)
- Propulsion: 2 shafts; 2 × diesel engines; 2 × electric motors
- Speed: 17.7 knots (32.8 km/h; 20.4 mph) surfaced; 7.6 knots (14.1 km/h; 8.7 mph) submerged
- Range: 8,500 nmi (15,700 km; 9,800 mi) at 10 knots (19 km/h; 12 mph) surfaced; 80 nmi (150 km; 92 mi) at 4 knots (7.4 km/h; 4.6 mph) submerged
- Test depth: 230 m (750 ft); Crush depth: 250–295 m (820–968 ft)
- Complement: 4 officers, 40–56 enlisted
- Armament: 4 × 53.3 cm (21 in) torpedo tubes in the bow; 14 × torpedoes or 26 TMA mines; 1 × 8.8 cm (3.46 in) deck gun (220 rounds); 1 x 2 cm (0.79 in) C/30 AA gun

Service record
- Part of: 26th U-boat Flotilla; 20 June 1941 – 31 March 1942; 24th U-boat Flotilla; 1 April 1942 – 30 June 1944; 22nd U-boat Flotilla; 1 July 1944 – 28 February 1945; 4th U-boat Flotilla; 1 March – 5 May 1945
- Identification codes: M 33 940
- Commanders: Oblt.z.S. Karl Hause; 20 June – 14 December 1941; Oblt.z.S. Günther Rosenberg; 15 December 1941 – 24 August 1942; Oblt.z.S. Eberhard Zimmermann; 25 August 1942 – 25 May 1943; Oblt.z.S. Götz Roth; 26 May – 5 October 1943; Oblt.z.S. Helmut Wicke; 13 December 1943 – 30 June 1944; Oblt.z.S. Hans-Jürgen Schley; 1 July 1944 – 19 March 1945; Oblt.z.S. Hugo Strehl; 20 March – 5 May 1945
- Operations: None
- Victories: None

German submarine U-351 was a Type VIIC U-boat of Nazi Germany's Kriegsmarine during World War II.

She carried out no patrols. She did not sink or damage any ships.

She was scuttled on 5 May 1945 in northern Germany.

== Design ==
German Type VIIC submarines were preceded by the shorter Type VIIB submarines. U-351 had a displacement of 769 tonnes (757 long tons) when at the surface and 871 tonnes (857 long tons) while submerged. She had a total length of 67.10 m (220 ft 2 in), a pressure hull length of 50.50 m (165 ft 8 in), a beam of 6.20 m (20 ft 4 in), a height of 9.60 m (31 ft 6 in), and a draught of 4.74 m (15 ft 7 in). The submarine was powered by two Germaniawerft F46 four-stroke, six-cylinder supercharged diesel engines producing a total of 2,800 to 3,200 metric horsepower (2,060 to 2,350 kW; 2,760 to 3,160 shp) for use while surfaced, two AEG GU 460/8-276 double-acting electric motors producing a total of 750 metric horsepower (550 kW; 740 shp) for use while submerged. She had two shafts and two 1.23 m (4 ft) propellers. The boat was capable of operating at depths of up to 230 metres (750 ft).

The submarine had a maximum surface speed of 17.7 knots (32.8 km/h; 20.4 mph) and a maximum submerged speed of 7.6 knots (14.1 km/h; 8.7 mph). When submerged, the boat could operate for 80 nautical miles (150 km; 92 mi) at 4 knots (7.4 km/h; 4.6 mph); when surfaced, she could travel 8,500 nautical miles (15,700 km; 9,800 mi) at 10 knots (19 km/h; 12 mph). U-351 was fitted with five 53.3 cm (21 in) torpedo tubes (four fitted at the bow and one at the stern), fourteen torpedoes, one 8.8 cm (3.46 in) SK C/35 naval gun, 220 rounds, and a 2 cm (0.79 in) C/30 anti-aircraft gun. The boat had a complement of between forty-four and sixty.

== Service history ==
The submarine was laid down on 4 March 1940 at the Flensburger Schiffbau-Gesellschaft yard at Flensburg as yard number 470, launched on 27 March 1941 and commissioned on 20 June under the command of Oberleutnant zur See Karl Hause.

She served with the 26th U-boat Flotilla from 20 June 1941, the 24th flotilla from 1 April 1942, the 22nd flotilla from 1 July 1944 and the 4th flotilla from 1 March 1945. All these assignments were for employment as a training or school boat. U-351 was scuttled on 5 May 1945 in Horup Haff, (east of Flensburg). The wreck was broken up in 1948.

== Bibliography ==
- Busch, Rainer; Röll, Hans-Joachim (1999). German U-boat commanders of World War II : a biographical dictionary. Translated by Brooks, Geoffrey. London, Annapolis, Md: Greenhill Books, Naval Institute Press. ISBN 1-55750-186-6.
- Busch, Rainer; Röll, Hans-Joachim (1999). Deutsche U-Boot-Verluste von September 1939 bis Mai 1945 [German U-boat losses from September 1939 to May 1945]. Der U-Boot-Krieg (in German). Vol. IV. Hamburg, Berlin, Bonn: Mittler. ISBN 3-8132-0514-2.
- Gröner, Erich; Jung, Dieter; Maass, Martin (1991). German Warships 1815–1945, U-boats and Mine Warfare Vessels. Vol. 2. Translated by Thomas, Keith; Magowan, Rachel. London: Conway Maritime Press. ISBN 0-85177-593-4.
