= German submarine U-287 =

German World War II submarine

Coordinates: 53°50′N 8°50′E

History

Nazi Germany
- Name: U-287
- Ordered: 5 June 1941
- Builder: Bremer Vulkan, Bremen-Vegesack
- Yard number: 52
- Laid down: 8 August 1942
- Launched: 13 August 1943
- Commissioned: 22 September 1943
- Fate: Scuttled 16 May 1945 (Sunk by a mine, according to official records)

General characteristics
- Class & type: Type VIIC submarine
- Displacement: 769 tonnes (757 long tons) surfaced; 871 t (857 long tons) submerged
- Length: 67.10 m (220 ft 2 in) o/a; 50.50 m (165 ft 8 in) pressure hull
- Beam: 6.20 m (20 ft 4 in) o/a; 4.70 m (15 ft 5 in) pressure hull
- Height: 9.60 m (31 ft 6 in)
- Draught: 4.74 m (15 ft 7 in)
- Installed power: 2,800–3,200 PS (2,100–2,400 kW; 2,800–3,200 bhp) (diesels); 750 PS (550 kW; 740 shp) (electric)
- Propulsion: 2 shafts; 2 × diesel engines; 2 × electric motors
- Speed: 17.7 knots (32.8 km/h; 20.4 mph) surfaced; 7.6 knots (14.1 km/h; 8.7 mph) submerged
- Range: 8,500 nmi (15,700 km; 9,800 mi) at 10 knots (19 km/h; 12 mph) surfaced; 80 nmi (150 km; 92 mi) at 4 knots (7.4 km/h; 4.6 mph) submerged
- Test depth: 230 m (750 ft); Crush depth: 250–295 m (820–968 ft)
- Complement: 4 officers, 40–56 enlisted
- Armament: 5 × 53.3 cm (21 in) torpedo tubes (four bow, one stern); 14 × torpedoes or 26 TMA mines; 1 × 8.8 cm (3.46 in) deck gun (220 rounds); 2 × twin 2 cm (0.79 in) C/30 anti-aircraft guns

Service record
- Part of: 24th U-boat Flotilla; 22 September 1943 – 28 February 1945; 31st U-boat Flotilla; 1 March – 8 May 1945
- Identification codes: M 20 576
- Commanders: Oblt.z.S. Heinrich Meyer; 22 September 1943 – 16 May 1945
- Operations: 1 patrol: 29 April – 16 May 1945
- Victories: None

German submarine U-287 was a Type VIIC U-boat of Nazi Germany's Kriegsmarine during World War II. The submarine was laid down on 8 August 1942 at the Bremer Vulkan yard at Bremen-Vegesack as yard number 52. She was launched on 13 August 1943 and commissioned on 22 September under the command of Oberleutnant zur See Heinrich Meyer. She did not sink or damage any ships.

Official records report that she was sunk by a mine in May 1945 in the Elbe estuary. But late interviews with crew members support that she was scuttled. According to these sources the remaining four crew members convinced British investigators they were struck by a mine. This version avoided the whole crew for being charged for destroying the sub which was supposed to be handed over to allies forces according to German Instrument of Surrender.

== Design ==
German Type VIIC submarines were preceded by the shorter Type VIIB submarines. U-287 had a displacement of 769 tonnes (757 long tons) when at the surface and 871 tonnes (857 long tons) while submerged. She had a total length of 67.10 m (220 ft 2 in), a pressure hull length of 50.50 m (165 ft 8 in), a beam of 6.20 m (20 ft 4 in), a height of 9.60 m (31 ft 6 in), and a draught of 4.74 m (15 ft 7 in). The submarine was powered by two Germaniawerft F46 four-stroke, six-cylinder supercharged diesel engines producing a total of 2,800 to 3,200 metric horsepower (2,060 to 2,350 kW; 2,760 to 3,160 shp) for use while surfaced, two AEG GU 460/8–27 double-acting electric motors producing a total of 750 metric horsepower (550 kW; 740 shp) for use while submerged. She had two shafts and two 1.23 m (4 ft) propellers. The boat was capable of operating at depths of up to 230 metres (750 ft).

The submarine had a maximum surface speed of 17.7 knots (32.8 km/h; 20.4 mph) and a maximum submerged speed of 7.6 knots (14.1 km/h; 8.7 mph). When submerged, the boat could operate for 80 nautical miles (150 km; 92 mi) at 4 knots (7.4 km/h; 4.6 mph); when surfaced, she could travel 8,500 nautical miles (15,700 km; 9,800 mi) at 10 knots (19 km/h; 12 mph). U-287 was fitted with five 53.3 cm (21 in) torpedo tubes (four fitted at the bow and one at the stern), fourteen torpedoes, one 8.8 cm (3.46 in) SK C/35 naval gun, 220 rounds, and two twin 2 cm (0.79 in) C/30 anti-aircraft guns. The boat had a complement of between forty-four and sixty.

== Service history ==
U-287 served with the 24th U-boat Flotilla for training from September 1943 to February 1945 and operationally with the 31st flotilla from 1 March.

The boat's only patrol was preceded by two short voyages from Kiel in April 1945 to Horten Naval Base and Kristiansand in Norway (the former being located northeast of Kristiansand).

=== Patrol and loss ===
The boat departed Kristiansand on 29 April 1945 and was stayed in the Elbe estuary. The whole crew but four evacuated on lifeboats to Altenbruch before the remaining crew scuttled the ship near Schelenkuhlen in the Elbe river on 16 May. They testified that they were sunk by a mine, which was documented as the official reason of loss.

== Bibliography ==
- Busch, Rainer; Röll, Hans-Joachim (1999). German U-boat commanders of World War II : a biographical dictionary. Translated by Brooks, Geoffrey. London, Annapolis, Md: Greenhill Books, Naval Institute Press. ISBN 1-55750-186-6.
- Busch, Rainer; Röll, Hans-Joachim (1999). Deutsche U-Boot-Verluste von September 1939 bis Mai 1945 [German U-boat losses from September 1939 to May 1945]. Der U-Boot-Krieg (in German). Vol. IV. Hamburg, Berlin, Bonn: Mittler. ISBN 3-8132-0514-2.
- Gröner, Erich; Jung, Dieter; Maass, Martin (1991). U-boats and Mine Warfare Vessels. German Warships 1815–1945. Vol. 2. Translated by Thomas, Keith; Magowan, Rachel. London: Conway Maritime Press. ISBN 0-85177-593-4.
