= German submarine U-763 =

German World War II submarine

History

Nazi Germany
- Name: U-763
- Ordered: 15 August 1940
- Builder: Kriegsmarinewerft Wilhelmshaven
- Yard number: 146
- Laid down: 21 January 1941
- Launched: 16 January 1943
- Commissioned: 13 March 1943
- Fate: Scuttled on 29 January 1945 in the Schichau-Werke shipyard, Königsberg in position 54°42′N 20°32′E after being damaged in a Soviet air raid.

General characteristics
- Class & type: Type VIIC submarine
- Displacement: 769 tonnes (757 long tons) surfaced; 871 t (857 long tons) submerged
- Length: 67.10 m (220 ft 2 in) o/a; 50.50 m (165 ft 8 in) pressure hull
- Beam: 6.20 m (20 ft 4 in) o/a; 4.70 m (15 ft 5 in) pressure hull
- Draught: 4.74 m (15 ft 7 in)
- Installed power: 2,800–3,200 PS (2,100–2,400 kW; 2,800–3,200 bhp) (diesels); 750 PS (550 kW; 740 shp) (electric)
- Propulsion: 2 shafts; 2 × diesel engines; 2 × electric motors
- Speed: 17.7 knots (32.8 km/h; 20.4 mph) surfaced; 7.6 knots (14.1 km/h; 8.7 mph) submerged
- Range: 8,500 nmi (15,700 km; 9,800 mi) at 10 knots (19 km/h; 12 mph) surfaced; 80 nmi (150 km; 92 mi) at 4 knots (7.4 km/h; 4.6 mph) submerged
- Test depth: 230 m (750 ft); Crush depth: 250–295 m (820–968 ft)
- Complement: 4 officers 40–56 enlisted
- Armament: 5 × 53.3 cm (21 in) torpedo tubes (four bow, one stern); 14 × torpedoes; 1 × 8.8 cm (3.46 in) deck gun (220 rounds); 2 × twin 2 cm (0.79 in) C/30 anti-aircraft guns

Service record
- Part of: 8th U-boat Flotilla; 13 March – 31 October 1943; 3rd U-boat Flotilla; 1 November 1943 – 30 September 1944; 33rd U-boat Flotilla; 1 – 31 October 1944; 24th U-boat Flotilla; 1 November 1944 – 29 January 1945
- Identification codes: M 51 254
- Commanders: Oblt.z.S. / Kptlt. Ernst Cordes; 13 March 1943 – 31 October 1944; Lt.z.S. Kurt Braun (acting); August – October 1944; Oblt.z.S. Karl-Heinz Schröter; 1 November 1944 – 29 January 1945
- Operations: 4 patrols: 1st patrol: 14 December 1943 – 7 February 1944; 2nd patrol: 19 – 27 March 1944; 3rd patrol: a. 10 June – 15 July 1944; b. 9 – 14 August 1944; 4th patrol: a. 23 August – 25 September 1944; b. 6 – 11 October 1944
- Victories: 1 merchant ship sunk (1,927 GRT)

German submarine U-763 was a Type VIIC U-boat built for Nazi Germany's Kriegsmarine for service during World War II. She was laid down on 21 January 1941 by Kriegsmarinewerft Wilhelmshaven as yard number 146, launched on 16 January 1943 and commissioned on 13 March 1943 under Oberleutnant zur See Ernst Cordes. On 1 November 1944, Oberleutnant zur See Karl-Heinz Schröter took over command as part of her transfer to 24th Flotilla.

== Design ==
German Type VIIC submarines were preceded by the shorter Type VIIB submarines. U-763 had a displacement of 769 tonnes (757 long tons) when at the surface and 871 tonnes (857 long tons) while submerged. She had a total length of 67.10 m (220 ft 2 in), a pressure hull length of 50.50 m (165 ft 8 in), a beam of 6.20 m (20 ft 4 in), a height of 9.60 m (31 ft 6 in), and a draught of 4.74 m (15 ft 7 in). The submarine was powered by two Germaniawerft F46 four-stroke, six-cylinder supercharged diesel engines producing a total of 2,800 to 3,200 metric horsepower (2,060 to 2,350 kW; 2,760 to 3,160 shp) for use while surfaced, two Garbe, Lahmeyer & Co. RP 137/c double-acting electric motors producing a total of 750 metric horsepower (550 kW; 740 shp) for use while submerged. She had two shafts and two 1.23 m (4 ft) propellers. The boat was capable of operating at depths of up to 230 metres (750 ft).

The submarine had a maximum surface speed of 17.7 knots (32.8 km/h; 20.4 mph) and a maximum submerged speed of 7.6 knots (14.1 km/h; 8.7 mph). When submerged, the boat could operate for 80 nautical miles (150 km; 92 mi) at 4 knots (7.4 km/h; 4.6 mph); when surfaced, she could travel 8,500 nautical miles (15,700 km; 9,800 mi) at 10 knots (19 km/h; 12 mph). U-763 was fitted with five 53.3 cm (21 in) torpedo tubes (four fitted at the bow and one at the stern), fourteen torpedoes, one 8.8 cm (3.46 in) SK C/35 naval gun, 220 rounds, and two twin 2 cm (0.79 in) C/30 anti-aircraft guns. The boat had a complement of between forty-four and sixty.

== Service history ==
The boat's career began with training at 8th U-boat Flotilla on 13 March 1943, followed by active service on 1 November 1943 as part of the 3rd Flotilla. When the situation deteriorated for the Germans in France, on 1 October 1944, following the invasion, she transferred to 33rd Flotilla in Flensburg, but stayed only one month. On 1 November 1944 she transferred to 24th Flotilla for training.

In four patrols she sunk one merchant ship, for a total of 1,927 gross register tons (GRT).

=== 4/5 February 1944 ===
On 4 February 1944, U-763 shot down a RAF Liberator bomber of 53 Squadron in the Bay of Biscay. On the following day, she successfully warded off three separate air attacks by the RAF, resulting in damage to a Liberator of 53 Squadron, a Wellington bomber of 172 Squadron and the loss of a Halifax bomber from 502 Squadron

=== Wolfpacks ===
U-763 took part in one wolfpack, namely:

- Rügen 3 (28 – 31 December 1943)

=== Fate ===
U-763 was scuttled on 29 January 1945 in the Schichau-Werke shipyard, Königsberg in position 54°42′N 20°32′E after being damaged in a Soviet air raid.

== Summary of raiding history ==
Date	Ship Name	Nationality	Tonnage (GRT)	Fate
5 July 1944	Glendinning	United Kingdom	1,927	Sunk

== Bibliography ==
- Busch, Rainer; Röll, Hans-Joachim (1999). German U-boat commanders of World War II : a biographical dictionary. Translated by Brooks, Geoffrey. London, Annapolis, Md: Greenhill Books, Naval Institute Press. ISBN 1-55750-186-6.
- Busch, Rainer; Röll, Hans-Joachim (1999). Der U-Boot-Krieg, 1939-1945: Deutsche U-Boot-Verluste von September 1939 bis Mai 1945 [German U-boat losses from September 1939 to May 1945] (in German). Vol. IV. Hamburg, Berlin, Bonn: Mittler. ISBN 3-8132-0514-2.
- Gröner, Eric; Jung, Dieter; Maass, Martin (1991). German Warships 1815-1945: U-boats and Mine Warfare Vessels. Vol. 2. Translated by Thomas, Keith; Magowan, Rachel. London: Conway Maritime Press. ISBN 0-85177-593-4.
- Sharpe, Peter (1998). U-Boat Fact File. Great Britain: Midland Publishing. ISBN 1-85780-072-9.
