= Albert Lauzemis =

German World War II U-boat commander

- Born: 12 March 1918
- Died: 10 April 1944 (aged 26)
- Military career
- Allegiance: Nazi Germany
- Branch: Kriegsmarine
- Service years: 1937–44
- Rank: Kapitänleutnant
- Commands: U-139; U-37; U-68
- Conflicts: World War II
- Awards: Iron Cross 2nd Class, Iron Cross 1st Class, German Cross in Gold

Albert Lauzemis (12 March 1918 – 10 April 1944) was a German U-boat commander in World War II.

== Naval career ==
Albert Lauzemis joined Nazi Germany's Kriegsmarine in 1937. He went through U-boat training and U-boat familiarization (Baubelehrung) from June 1940 to February 1941. He trained for the Type IXC boats and on commissioning of U-68 by Kapitän zur See Karl-Friedrich Merten he became its Second Watch Officer (2WO). Lauzemis sailed on the boat for two patrols as 2WO and then for the third patrol as the First Watch Officer (1WO). He served on the boat until April 1942. During Lauzemis' stint on U-68 Merten sank eleven ships for over 63,000 tons. Lauzemis went through U-boat commander training with the 24th U-boat Flotilla in May 1942 and on 18 May he was given command of the small "duck" school boat U-139. He only served there for six weeks before taking command of the much larger Type IX U-37 on 1 July 1942. The hugely successful boat was by that time a school boat in the Baltic Sea. Lauzemis left the U-37 on 3 January 1943 and on the 21st took command of the U-68, his old boat. He left for his first war patrol as commander on 7 May 1943, heading for the Caribbean Sea. On the second patrol with the U-68 the outbound boat was attacked on 14 June 1943 having left base at Lorient only 2 days earlier. Lauzemis, the 2WO and another man were wounded and one lost overboard. The 1WO, Scherraus, brought the boat back to base. Lauzemis spent six weeks in hospital and was relieved of command during his recovery. During his five patrols, 228 days at sea, Lauzemis sank six ships for almost 28,000 tons. On 30 July Albert Lauzemis was again in command of his U-68 and took the boat out again on 14 August 1943. Lauzemis was killed when the boat was sunk on 10 April 1944 north-west of Madeira, Portugal, in position 33°24′N 18°59′W, by depth charges and rockets from Avenger and Wildcat aircraft of the US escort carrier USS Guadalcanal.

== Summary of career ==
=== Ships sunk ===
Date	U-boat	Name of ship	Nationality	Tonnage	Fate
13 March 1943	U-68	Cities Service Missouri	United States	7,506	Sunk
13 March 1943	U-68	Ceres	Netherlands	2,680	Sunk
21 October 1943	U-68	HMS Orfasy	Royal Navy	545	Sunk
22 October 1943	U-68	Litiopa	Norway	5,356	Sunk
31 October 1943	U-68	New Columbia	United Kingdom	6,574	Sunk
30 November 1943	U-68	Fort de Vaux	Free France	5,186	Sunk

=== Awards ===
- Iron Cross 2nd Class
- Iron Cross 1st Class
- German Cross in Gold - 6 November 1943 (posthumous)

== Bibliography ==
- Busch, Rainer; Röll, Hans-Joachim (1999). German U-boat commanders of World War II : a biographical dictionary. Translated by Brooks, Geoffrey. London, Annapolis, Md: Greenhill Books, Naval Institute Press. ISBN 1-55750-186-6.
