= 26th U-boat Flotilla =

26. Unterseebootsflottille
- Active: April 1941–May 1945
- Country: Nazi Germany
- Branch: Kriegsmarine
- Type: U-boat flotilla
- Garrison/HQ: Pillau (1943–1945); Warnemünde (1945)

Commanders
- Notable commanders: Korvkpt. Hans-Gerrit von Stockhausen; Korvkpt. Karl-Friedrich Merten; Korvkpt. Ernst Bauer

26th U-boat Flotilla ("26. Unterseebootsflottille") was a training flotilla ("Ausbildungsflottille ") of Nazi Germany's Kriegsmarine during World War II.

The flotilla was formed at Pillau in April 1941 under the command of Korvettenkapitän Hans-Gerrit von Stockhausen. The flotilla trained newly commissioned U-boats in the firing of torpedoes (Torpedoschiessausbildung), a course which lasted for three to four weeks. In 1945, as the Russians advanced deeper into Eastern Europe, the flotilla relocated to Warnemünde. The flotilla was disbanded in May 1945 when Germany surrendered.

== Flotilla commanders ==
- Korvettenkapitän Hans-Gerrit von Stockhausen (April 1941–January 1943)
- Korvettenkapitän Karl-Friedrich Merten (January–April 1943)
- Fregattenkapitan Helmut Brümmer-Patzig (April 1943–March 1945)
- Korvettenkapitän Ernst Bauer (April–May 1945)

== Assigned U-boats ==
Seven U-boats were assigned to this flotilla during its service.

- U-37
- U-46
- U-48
- U-52
- U-80
- U-101
- U-351
