= German submarine U-750 =

German World War II submarine

History

Nazi Germany
- Name: U-750
- Ordered: 25 August 1941
- Builder: Schichau-Werke, Danzig
- Yard number: 1560
- Laid down: 29 September 1942
- Launched: 10 June 1943
- Commissioned: 26 August 1943
- Fate: Scuttled on 5 May 1945

General characteristics
- Class & type: German Type VIIC submarine
- Displacement: 769 tonnes (757 long tons) surfaced; 871 t (857 long tons) submerged
- Length: Overall: 67.10 m (220.1 ft); Pressure hull: 50.50 m (165.7 ft)
- Beam: Overall: 6.20 m (20.3 ft); Pressure hull: 4.70 m (15.4 ft)
- Draught: 4.74 m (15.6 ft)
- Installed power: 2,800–3,200 PS (2,100–2,400 kW; 2,800–3,200 bhp) (diesels); 750 PS (550 kW; 740 shp) (electric)
- Propulsion: 2 shafts; 2 × diesel engines; 2 × electric motors
- Speed: Surfaced: 17.7 knots (32.8 km/h; 20.4 mph); Submerged: 7.6 knots (14.1 km/h; 8.7 mph)
- Range: Surfaced: 8,500 nmi (15,700 km; 9,800 mi) at 10 knots (19 km/h; 12 mph); Submerged: 80 nmi (150 km; 92 mi) at 4 knots (7.4 km/h; 4.6 mph)
- Test depth: Calculated crush depth: 220 m (720 ft)
- Complement: 4 officers, 40–56 enlisted
- Armament: 5 × 53.3 cm (21 in) torpedo tubes (four bow, one stern); 14 × torpedoes; 1 × 8.8 cm (3.46 in) deck gun (220 rounds); 2 × twin 2 cm (0.79 in) C/30 anti-aircraft guns

Service record
- Part of: 8th U-boat Flotilla; 26 August – 8 September 1943; 24th U-boat Flotilla; 29 September 1943 – 1 April 1945; 5th U-Boat Flotilla; 1 April – 5 May 1945
- Identification codes: M 55 404
- Commanders: T.V. Emerico Siriani; 26 August – 8 September 1943; Oblt.z.S. Georg von Bitter; 29 September 1943 – 31 August 1944; Oblt.z.S. Justus Grawert; 1 September 1944 – 5 May 1945
- Operations: None
- Victories: None

German submarine U-750 was a German Type VIIC submarine U-boat built for Nazi Germany's Kriegsmarine for service during World War II.

== Design ==
German Type VIIC submarines were preceded by the shorter Type VIIB submarines. U-750 had a displacement of 769 tonnes (757 long tons) when at the surface and 871 tonnes (857 long tons) while submerged. She had a total length of 67.10 m (220 ft 2 in), a pressure hull length of 50.50 m (165 ft 8 in), a beam of 6.20 m (20 ft 4 in), a height of 9.60 m (31 ft 6 in), and a draught of 4.74 m (15 ft 7 in). The submarine was powered by two Germaniawerft F46 four-stroke, six-cylinder supercharged diesel engines producing a total of 2,800 to 3,200 metric horsepower (2,060 to 2,350 kW; 2,760 to 3,160 shp) for use while surfaced, two AEG GU 460/8–27 double-acting electric motors producing a total of 750 metric horsepower (550 kW; 740 shp) for use while submerged. She had two shafts and two 1.23 m (4 ft) propellers. The boat was capable of operating at depths of up to 230 metres (750 ft).

The submarine had a maximum surface speed of 17.7 knots (32.8 km/h; 20.4 mph) and a maximum submerged speed of 7.6 knots (14.1 km/h; 8.7 mph). When submerged, the boat could operate for 80 nautical miles (150 km; 92 mi) at 4 knots (7.4 km/h; 4.6 mph); when surfaced, she could travel 8,500 nautical miles (15,700 km; 9,800 mi) at 10 knots (19 km/h; 12 mph). U-750 was fitted with five 53.3 cm (21 in) torpedo tubes (four fitted at the bow and one at the stern), fourteen torpedoes, one 8.8 cm (3.46 in) SK C/35 naval gun, 220 rounds, and two twin 2 cm (0.79 in) C/30 anti-aircraft guns. The boat had a complement of between forty-four and sixty.

== Service history ==
Work on U-750 began on 29 September 1942 as yard number 1560 of the F Schichau GmbH in the former Free City of Danzig. She was commissioned on 26 August 1943, under the command of Tenente di vascello Emerico Siriani and trained with the 8th U-boat Flotilla until 8 September 1943. On 29 September 1943 however, Emerico Siriani was replaced by Oberleutnant zur See Georg von Bitter, then on 1 September 1944 by Oberleutnant zur See Justus Grawert, who would command her for the rest of her service career.

On 1 April 1945, U-750 was moved to the 5th U-boat Flotilla, but remained as a training boat until she was scuttled on 5 May 1945.

== Bibliography ==
- Busch, Rainer; Röll, Hans-Joachim (1999). German U-boat commanders of World War II : a biographical dictionary. Translated by Brooks, Geoffrey. London, Annapolis, Md: Greenhill Books, Naval Institute Press. ISBN 1-55750-186-6.
- Busch, Rainer; Röll, Hans-Joachim (1999). Deutsche U-Boot-Verluste von September 1939 bis Mai 1945 [German U-boat losses from September 1939 to May 1945]. Der U-Boot-Krieg (in German). Vol. IV. Hamburg, Berlin, Bonn: Mittler. ISBN 3-8132-0514-2.
- Gröner, Erich; Jung, Dieter; Maass, Martin (1991). U-boats and Mine Warfare Vessels. German Warships 1815–1945. Vol. 2. Translated by Thomas, Keith; Magowan, Rachel. London: Conway Maritime Press. ISBN 0-85177-593-4.
