= German submarine U-80 (1941) =

German World War II submarine

Coordinates: 54.4167°N 19.8333°E

History

Nazi Germany
- Name: U-80
- Ordered: 25 January 1939
- Builder: Bremer Vulkan, Bremen-Vegesack
- Yard number: 8
- Laid down: 17 April 1940
- Launched: 11 February 1941
- Commissioned: 8 April 1941
- Fate: Sunk on 28 November 1944, in a diving accident

General characteristics
- Class & type: Type VIIC submarine
- Displacement: 769 tonnes (757 long tons) surfaced; 871 t (857 long tons) submerged
- Length: 67.10 m (220 ft 2 in) o/a; 50.50 m (165 ft 8 in) pressure hull
- Beam: 6.20 m (20 ft 4 in) o/a; 4.70 m (15 ft 5 in) pressure hull
- Height: 9.60 m (31 ft 6 in)
- Draught: 4.74 m (15 ft 7 in)
- Installed power: 2,800–3,200 PS (2,100–2,400 kW; 2,800–3,200 bhp) (diesels); 750 PS (550 kW; 740 shp) (electric)
- Propulsion: 2 shafts; 2 × diesel engines; 2 × electric motors
- Speed: 17.7 knots (32.8 km/h; 20.4 mph) surfaced; 7.6 knots (14.1 km/h; 8.7 mph) submerged
- Range: 8,500 nmi (15,700 km; 9,800 mi) at 10 knots (19 km/h; 12 mph) surfaced; 80 nmi (150 km; 92 mi) at 4 knots (7.4 km/h; 4.6 mph) submerged
- Test depth: 230 m (750 ft); Crush depth: 250–295 m (820–968 ft)
- Complement: 4 officers, 40–56 enlisted
- Armament: 2 × 53.3 cm (21 in) torpedo tubes (bow); 14 × G7e torpedoes or 26 TMA mines; 1 × 8.8 cm (3.46 in) deck gun (220 rounds); 1 x 2 cm (0.79 in) C/30 AA gun

Service record
- Part of: 1st U-boat Flotilla; 8 – 30 April 1941; 26th U-boat Flotilla; 1 May 1941 – 31 March 1942; 24th U-boat Flotilla; 1 April 1942 – 31 August 1943; 23rd U-boat Flotilla; 1 September – 30 November 1943; 21st U-boat Flotilla; 1 December 1943 – 28 November 1944
- Identification codes: M 37 498
- Commanders: Oblt.z.S. Georg Staats; 8 April – 5 October 1941; Oblt.z.S. Hans Benker; 6 October 1941 – 4 May 1942; Oblt.z.S. Oskar Curio; 5 May – 22 November 1942; Lt.z.S. / Oblt.z.S. Hans-Adolf Isermeyer; 23 November 1942 – 30 September 1943; Oblt.z.S. / Kptlt. Hans Keerle; 1 October 1943 – 28 November 1944
- Operations: None
- Victories: None

German submarine U-80 was a Type VIIC submarine of Nazi Germany's Kriegsmarine during World War II. She was laid down at the Bremer Vulkan Vegesacker Werft in Bremen as yard number 8 on 17 April 1940, launched on 11 February 1941 and commissioned on 8 April under Oberleutnant zur See Georg Staats.

U-80 spent her career as a training boat, first with the 1st U-boat Flotilla, then the 26th, 24th, 23rd and 21st flotillas. She sank or damaged no ships, but was herself sunk in a diving accident west of Pillau (now Baltiysk in modern Russia), on 28 November 1944.

== Design ==
German Type VIIC submarines were preceded by the shorter Type VIIB submarines. U-80 had a displacement of 769 tonnes (757 long tons) when at the surface and 871 tonnes (857 long tons) while submerged. She had a total length of 67.10 m (220 ft 2 in), a pressure hull length of 50.50 m (165 ft 8 in), a beam of 6.20 m (20 ft 4 in), a height of 9.60 m (31 ft 6 in), and a draught of 4.74 m (15 ft 7 in). The submarine was powered by two MAN M6V 40/46 four-stroke, six-cylinder supercharged diesel engines producing a total of 2,800 to 3,200 metric horsepower (2,060 to 2,350 kW; 2,760 to 3,160 shp) for use while surfaced, two Brown, Boveri & Cie GG UB 720/8 double-acting electric motors producing a total of 750 metric horsepower (550 kW; 740 shp) for use while submerged. She had two shafts and two 1.23 m (4 ft) propellers. The boat was capable of operating at depths of up to 230 metres (750 ft).

The submarine had a maximum surface speed of 17.7 knots (32.8 km/h; 20.4 mph) and a maximum submerged speed of 7.6 knots (14.1 km/h; 8.7 mph). When submerged, the boat could operate for 80 nautical miles (150 km; 92 mi) at 4 knots (7.4 km/h; 4.6 mph); when surfaced, she could travel 8,500 nautical miles (15,700 km; 9,800 mi) at 10 knots (19 km/h; 12 mph). U-80 was fitted with two 53.3 cm (21 in) torpedo tubes at the bow, fourteen torpedoes, one 8.8 cm (3.46 in) SK C/35 naval gun, 220 rounds, and a 2 cm (0.79 in) C/30 anti-aircraft gun. The boat had a complement of between forty-four and sixty.

== Bibliography ==
- Busch, Rainer; Röll, Hans-Joachim (1999). German U-boat commanders of World War II: a biographical dictionary. Translated by Brooks, Geoffrey. London, Annapolis, Md: Greenhill Books, Naval Institute Press. ISBN 1-55750-186-6.
- Busch, Rainer; Röll, Hans-Joachim (1999). Der U-Boot-Krieg, 1939-1945: Deutsche U-Boot-Verluste von September 1939 bis Mai 1945 [German U-boat losses from September 1939 to May 1945] (in German). Vol. IV. Hamburg, Berlin, Bonn: Mittler. ISBN 3-8132-0514-2.
- Gröner, Eric; Jung, Dieter; Maass, Martin (1991). German Warships 1815-1945: U-boats and Mine Warfare Vessels. Vol. 2. Translated by Thomas, Keith; Magowan, Rachel. London: Conway Maritime Press. ISBN 0-85177-593-4.
