= Uppland Runic Inscription 80 =

Coordinates: 59°22′18″N 17°55′12″E

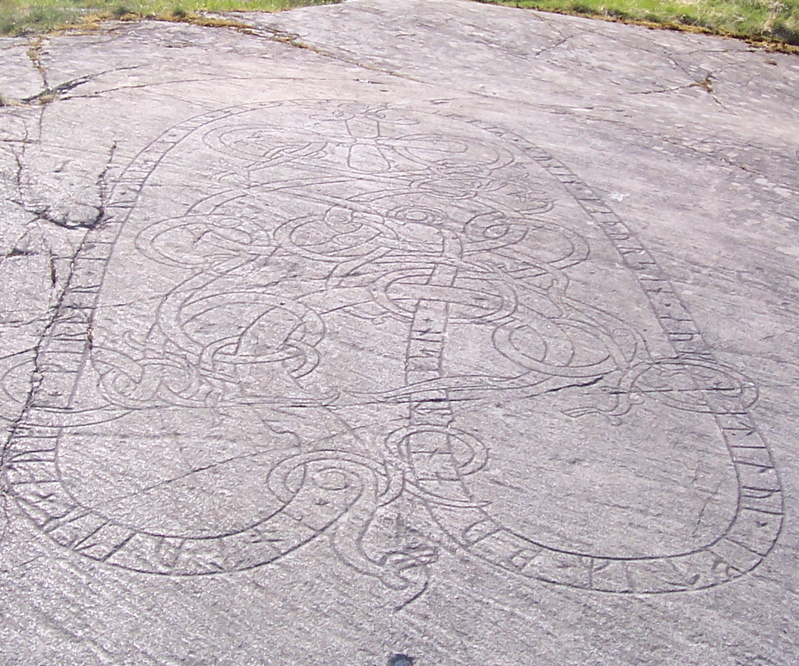
Runic inscription U 80 is located in Sundby, Uppland, Sweden.

Uppland Runic Inscription 80 or U 80 is the Rundata catalog listing for a Viking Age memorial runic inscription that is located in Sundby, which is in Solna Municipality, Stockholm County, Sweden, and in the historic province of Uppland.

== Description ==
This inscription consists of runic text in the younger futhark carved on an intertwined serpent and a Christian cross near the top of the design. The inscription is carved into a rock-face and is 3.5 meters high by 1.5 meters wide. The inscription is classified as being carved in runestone style Pr4, which is also known as Urnes style. This runestone style is characterized by slim and stylized animals that are interwoven into tight patterns. The animal heads are typically seen in profile with slender almond-shaped eyes and upwardly curled appendages on the noses and the necks. Although unsigned, the inscription for stylistic reasons has been attributed to either the runemaster Fot or to his son Torgöt Fotsarve. Fot was active in southern Uppland during the middle of the 11th century.

The runic text states that the inscription is a memorial to a man named Sveinn that was raised by his sons Andvéttr and Gerðarr and by his wife Ketilvé.

The inscription is known locally as the Sundbyhällen.

== Inscription ==
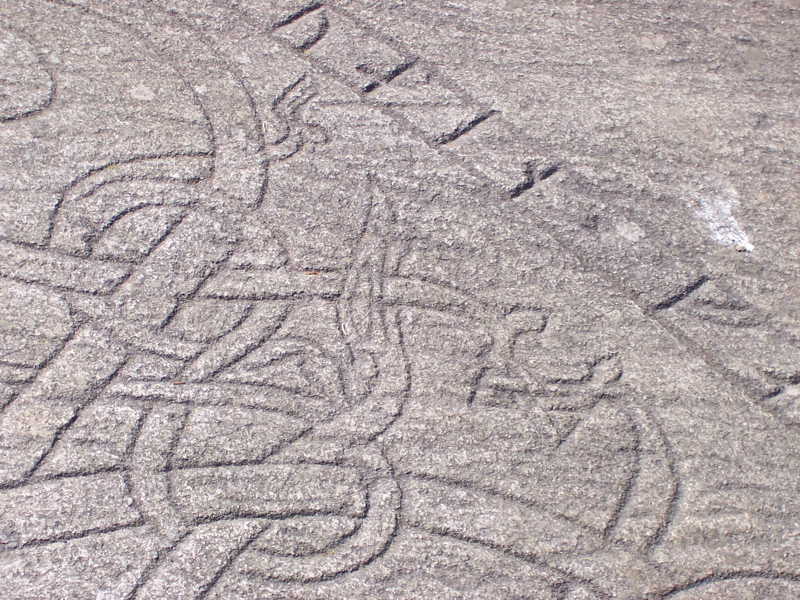
Detail showing the intertwined serpents.

=== Transliteration of the runes into Latin characters ===
× antuetr × auk + kerþar + litu × rista × runar × þisa × iftiʀ × suain × faþur sin × auk × katilui × iftiʀ × buanta sin +

=== Transcription into Old Norse ===
Andvettr ok Gærðarr letu rista runaʀ þessaʀ æftiʀ Svæin, faður sinn, ok Kætilvi æftiʀ boanda sinn.

=== Translation in English ===
Andvéttr and Gerðarr had these runes carved in memory of Sveinn, their father; and Ketilvé in memory of her husbandman.

== See also ==
- List of runestones
