= 24th U-boat Flotilla =

Nazi Germany military unit during WW II

24. Unterseebootsflottille
- Active: November 1939–March 1945
- Country: Nazi Germany
- Branch: Kriegsmarine
- Type: U-boat flotilla

Commanders
- Notable commanders: FrgKpt. Karl-Friedrich Merten

24th U-boat Flotilla ("24. Unterseebootsflottille") was a training flotilla ("Ausbildungsflottille") of Nazi Germany's Kriegsmarine during World War II.

== Unit history ==
The flotilla was founded at Danzig in November 1939 under the command of Korvettenkapitän Hannes Weingärtner as the Unterseebootsausbildungsflottille ("U-boat Training Flotilla"). It was redesignated 1. Unterseebootsausbildungsflottille in April 1940, and then 24. Unterseebootsflottille in June 1940.

The flotilla trained new U-boat commanders in attack techniques in the Kommandantenschiesslehrgang ("Commanders shooting training course"). The course lasted four weeks and trained 10 to 12 officers each time. The flotilla was disbanded in March 1945.

== Bases ==
- Danzig (November 1939–June 1940)
- Memel (June 1940–June 1941)
- Trondheim (June–September 1941)
- Memel (September 1941–October 1944)
- Gotenhafen (October 1944–February 1945)
- Eckernförde (February–March 1945)

== Flotilla commanders ==
- Korvettenkapitän Hannes Weingärtner (November 1939–July 1942)
- Kapitän zur See Rudolf Peters (July 1942–January 1943)
- Fregattenkapitan Karl-Friedrich Merten (March 1943–May 1944)
- Korvettenkapitän Karl Jasper (May–July 1944)
- Fregattenkapitan Karl-Friedrich Merten (July 1944–March 1945)

== Assigned U-boats ==
Fifty-three U-boats were assigned to this flotilla during its service.

- U-8
- U-9
- U-14
- U-18
- U-19
- U-28
- U-29
- U-30
- U-34
- U-38
- U-46
- U-52
- U-56
- U-71
- U-72
- U-80
- U-96
- U-101
- U-103
- U-121
- U-142
- U-143
- U-148
- U-151
- U-152
- U-236
- U-251
- U-287
- U-351
- U-393
- U-554
- U-555
- U-560
- U-579
- U-612
- U-704
- U-747
- U-748
- U-749
- U-750
- U-763
- U-821
- U-982
- U-999
- U-1007
- U-1008
- U-1161
- U-1162
- U-1192
- U-1193
- U-1195
- U-1207
- UD-4
