= List of German U-boats in World War II (1-599) =

The German military submarines known as U-boats that were in action during World War II were built between 1935 and 1944, and were numbered in sequence from U-1 upwards. Numbering was according to the sequence in which construction orders were allocated to the individual shipyards, rather than commissioning date; thus some boats carrying high numbers were commissioned well before boats with lower numbers. Later in the war, whole contracts for older designs were sometimes cancelled in favour of newer designs, with the numbers allocated being reused later.

The U-boat fleet sank large tonnages of Allied shipping, both warships and merchant ships. Most of the U-boats were ultimately lost in combat or were scuttled.

				Warships (Including auxiliaries)				Merchant Ships						Fate		
				Sunk & Total Loss		Damaged		Sunk		Damaged		Total Loss		Fate		
Name		Type	Notable Commanders	No.	Tons & GRT	No.	Tons & GRT	No.	GRT	No.	GRT	No.	GRT	Event	Date	Notes
U-1	1935	IIA	Klaus Ewerth	0	0	0	0	0	0	0	0	0	0	Sunk	6 April 1940	Struck a mine
U-2	1935	IIA	Hans Heidtmann, Heinrich Liebe, Helmut Rosenbaum, Herbert Schultze	0	0	0	0	0	0	0	0	0	0	Sunk	8 April 1944	Training boat
U-3	1935	IIA	Joachim Schepke, Otto von Bülow, Hans-Hartwig Trojer	0	0	0	0	2	2,348	0	0	0	0	Stricken	1 August 1944	
U-4	1935	IIA	Heinz-Otto Schultze	1	1,090	0	0	3	5,133	0	0	0	0	Stricken	1 August 1944	
U-5	1935	IIA	Heinrich Lehmann-Willenbrock	0	0	0	0	0	0	0	0	0	0	Sunk	19 March 1943	Accident
U-6	1935	IIA	Adalbert Schnee	0	0	0	0	0	0	0	0	0	0	Stricken	7 August 1944	Training boat mostly
U-7	1935	IIB	Karl Schrott, Siegfried Koitschka	0	0	0	0	1	2,694	0	0	1	1,830	Sunk	18 February 1944	Accident
U-8	1935	IIB	Otto Schuhart, Heinrich Lehmann-Willenbrock, Eitel-Friedrich Kentrat	0	0	0	0	0	0	0	0	0	0	Scuttled	5 May 1945	
U-9	1935	IIB	Wolfgang Lüth	1	552	1	412	7	16,669	0	0	0	0	Sunk	20 August 1944	Soviet aircraft. Later raised & entered as Soviet Navy TS-16
U-10	1935	IIB	Herbert Sohler, Georg-Wilhelm Schulz, Rolf Mützelburg, Hans-Rudolf Rösing	0	0	0	0	2	6,356	0	0	0	0	Stricken	1 August 1944	
U-11	1935	IIB	Hans-Rudolf Rösing, Viktor Schütze	0	0	0	0	0	0	0	0	0	0	Scuttled	3 May 1945	
U-12	1935	IIB		0	0	0	0	0	0	0	0	0	0	Sunk	8 October 1939	Struck a mine
U-13	1935	IIB	Hans-Gerrit von Stockhausen, Wolfgang Lüth	0	0	0	0	9	28,056	3	26,218	0	0	Sunk	31 May 1940	HMS Weston
U-14	1935	IIB	Victor Oehrn, Herbert Wohlfarth, Gerhard Bigalk, Hans Heidtmann	0	0	0	0	9	12,344	0	0	0	0	Scuttled	5 May 1945	
U-15	1936	IIB		0	0	0	0	3	4,532	0	0	0	0	Sunk	30 January 1940	Rammed by accident
U-16	1936	IIB		1	57	0	0	1	3,378	0	0	0	0	Sunk	25 October 1939	Run aground
U-17	1935	IIB		0	0	0	0	3	1,825	0	0	0	0	Scuttled	5 May 1945	
U-18	1935	IIB	Ernst Mengersen, Karl Fleige	1	400	1	56	2	1,500	1	7,745	0	0	Scuttled	25 August 1944	Damaged by Soviet air raid
U-19	1935	IIB	Viktor Schütze, Joachim Schepke	1	441	0	0	14	35,430	0	0	0	0	Scuttled	11 September 1944	
U-20	1936	IIB	Karl-Heinz Moehle	1	9	0	0	12	30,058	1	1,846	2	8,446	Scuttled	10 September 1944	
U-21	1936	IIB	Fritz Frauenheim, Hans-Heinrich Döhler	1	605	1	11,500	5	10,706	0	0	0	0	Scrapped	1 February 1945	Training boat
U-22	1936	IIB	Werner Winter	3	5,108	0	0	6	7,344	0	0	0	0	Missing	27 March 1940	
U-23	1936	IIB	Otto Kretschmer	2	1,410	2	1,061	7	11,179	0	0	3	18,199	Scuttled	10 September 1944	Prevent Soviet capture
U-24	1936	IIB		5	573	0	0	1	961	1	7,661	1	7,886	Scuttled	25 August 1944	
U-25	1936	IA	Eberhard Godt, Viktor Schütze, Otto Schuhart	1	17,046	0	0	7	33,209	1	7,638	0	0	Sunk	2 August 1940	Struck a mine
U-26	1936	IA	Klaus Ewerth, Werner Hartmann	0	0	0	0	11	48,645	1	4,871	0	0	Scuttled	1 July 1940	Badly damaged by depth charges
U-27	1936	VIIA	Hans-Georg von Friedeburg	0	0	0	0	2	624	0	0	0	0	Sunk	20 September 1939	HMS Fortune and HMS Faulknor
U-28	1936	VIIA	Fritz-Julius Lemp, Günter Kuhnke, Friedrich Guggenberger, Karl-Heinz Marbach	1	4,443	0	0	11	42,252	2	10,067	1	9,577	Scuttled	17 March 1944	Damaged in collision accident
U-29	1936	VIIA	Otto Schuhart, Georg Lassen, Karl-Heinz Marbach	1	22,500	0	0	12	67,277	0	0	0	0	Scuttled	5 May 1945	
U-30	1936	VIIA	Fritz-Julius Lemp	1	325	1	31,100	16	86,165	1	5,642	0	0	Scuttled	5 May 1945	
U-31	1936	VIIA		2	160	1	33,950	11	27,751	0	0	0	0	Sunk	2 November 1940	HMS Antelope
U-32	1937	VIIA	Werner Lott, Hans Jenisch	0	0	1	8,000	20	116,836	4	32,274	0	0	Sunk	30 October 1940	HMS Harvester & HMS Highlander
U-33	1936	VIIA		0	0	0	0	10	19,261	0	0	1	3,670	Sunk	12 February 1940	HMS Gleaner
U-34	1936	VIIA	Wilhelm Rollmann, Horst-Arno Fenski	4	3,290	0	0	19	91,989	0	0	0	0	Sunk	5 August 1943	In collision
U-35	1936	VIIA	Klaus Ewerth, Hans Rudolf Rösing, Otto Kretschmer, Werner Lott	0	0	0	0	4	7,850	1	6,014	0	0	Scuttled	29 November 1939	HMS Kingston, HMS Icarus and HMS Kashmir
U-36	1936	VIIA	Klaus Ewerth	0	0	0	0	3	4,181	0	0	0	0	Sunk	4 December 1939	HMS Salmon
U-37	1938	IXA	Werner Hartmann, Victor Oehrn, Asmus Nicolai Clausen, Ulrich Folkers, Albert Lauzemis	2	2,404	0	0	53	200,063	1	9,494	0	0	Scuttled	8 May 1945	
U-38	1938	IXA	Heinrich Liebe	0	0	0	0	35	188,967	1	3,670	0	0	Scuttled	5 May 1945	
U-39	1938	IXA		0	0	0	0	0	0	0	0	0	0	Sunk	14 September 1939	HMS Faulknor, HMS Foxhound and HMS Firedrake
U-40	1938	IXA		0	0	0	0	0	0	0	0	0	0	Sunk	13 October 1939	Struck a mine
U-41	1939	IXA		0	0	0	0	5	22,815	1	8,096	0	0	Sunk	5 February 1940	HMS Antelope
U-42	1939	IXA		0	0	0	0	1	4,803	0	0	0	0	Sunk	13 October 1939	HMS Imogen and HMS Ilex
U-43	1939	IXA	Wolfgang Lüth	0	0	0	0	21	117,036	1	10,350	1	9,131	Sunk	30 July 1943	US Grumman Avenger aircraft
U-44	1939	IXA		0	0	0	0	8	30,885	0	0	0	0	Sunk	13 March 1940	Struck a mine
U-45	1938	VIIB		0	0	0	0	2	19,313	0	0	0	0	Sunk	14 October 1939	HMS Inglefield, HMS Ivanhoe and HMS Intrepid
U-46	1938	VIIB	Engelbert Endrass	2	35,284	0	0	20	85,792	4	25,491	1	2,080	Scuttled	5 May 1945	
U-47	1938	VIIB	Günther Prien	1	29,150	1	10,035	30	162,769	8	62,751	0	0	Sunk	7 March 1941	HMS Wolverine
U-48	1939	VIIB	Herbert Schultze, Hans-Rudolf Rösing, Heinrich Bleichrodt	1	1,060	0	0	50	299,477	4	27,877	0	0	Scuttled	3 May 1945	The most successful U-boat
U-49	1939	VIIB		0	0	0	0	1	4,258	0	0	0	0	Sunk	15 April 1940	HMS Fearless and HMS Brazen
U-50	1939	VIIB		0	0	0	0	4	16,089	0	0	0	0	Sunk	6 April 1940	Struck a mine
U-51	1938	VIIB		1	4,724	0	0	5	26,296	0	0	0	0	Sunk	20 August 1940	HMS Cachalot
U-52	1939	VIIB	Helmut Möhlmann	0	0	0	0	13	56,333	0	0	0	0	Sunk	3 May 1945	
U-53	1939	VIIB	Heinrich Schonder	0	0	0	0	7	27,316	1	8,022	0	0	Sunk	23 / 24 February 1940	HMS Gurkha
U-54	1939	VIIB		0	0	0	0	0	0	0	0	0	0	Sunk	13 February 1940	Struck a mine
U-55	1939	VIIB		0	0	0	0	6	15,853	0	0	0	0	Sunk	30 January 1940	HMS Whitshed, HMS Fowey, French destroyers Valmy, Guépard and RAF Sunderland
U-56	1938	IIC	Wilhelm Zahn, Walter Käding	1	16,923	0	0	3	8,860	1	3,829	0	0	Scuttled	3 May 1945	
U-57	1938	IIC	Erich Topp, Claus Korth	1	8,240	0	0	11	48,053	2	10,403	1	10,191	Scuttled	3 May 1945	
U-58	1938	IIC	Herbert Kuppisch, Heinrich Schonder, Dietrich Schöneboom, Horst Hamm	1	8,401	0	0	6	16,148	0	0	0	0	Scuttled	3 May 1945	
U-59	1938	IIC	Siegfried von Forstner	2	864	0	0	17	34,130	1	8,009	1	4,943	Scuttled	3 May 1945	
U-60	1939	IIC	Adalbert Schnee, Georg Schewe	0	0	0	0	3	7,561	1	15,434	0	0	Scuttled	5 May 1945	
U-61	1939	IIC	Jürgen Oesten	0	0	0	0	5	19,668	1	4,434	0	0	Scuttled	5 May 1945	
U-62	1939	IIC	Waldemar Mehl	1	1,350	0	0	1	4,581	0	0	0	0	Scuttled	5 May 1945	
U-63	1939	IIC		0	0	0	0	1	3,840	0	0	0	0	Sunk	25 February 1940	HMS Imogen, HMS Escort, HMS Inglefield and HMS Narwhal
U-64	1939	IXB	Georg-Wilhelm Schulz	0	0	0	0	0	0	0	0	0	0	Sunk	13 April 1940	RN Swordfish
U-65	1940	IXB	Hans-Gerrit von Stockhausen	0	0	0	0	12	66,174	3	22,490	0	0	Sunk	28 April 1941	HMS Douglas
U-66	1940	IXC	Robert-Richard Zapp, Friedrich Markworth	0	0	2	64	33	200,021	2	22,674	0	0	Sunk	6 May 1944	USS Buckley, US Avenger & Wildcat aircraft
U-67	1940	IXC	Heinrich Bleichrodt, Günther Müller-Stöckheim	0	0	0	0	13	72,138	5	29,726	0	0	Sunk	16 July 1943	US Avenger aircraft
U-68	1940	IXC	Karl-Friedrich Merten, Albert Lauzemis	1	545	0	0	32	197,453	0	0	0	0	Sunk	10 April 1944	US Avenger & Wildcat aircraft
U-69	1940	VIIC	Jost Metzler, Wilhelm Zahn	0	0	0	0	17	67,515	1	4,887	1	5,445	Sunk	17 February 1943	HMS Fame
U-70	1940	VIIC		0	0	0	0	1	820	3	20,484	0	0	Sunk	7 March 1941	HMS Camellia and HMS Arbutus
U-71	1940	VIIC		0	0	0	0	5	38,894	0	0	0	0	Scuttled	2 May 1945	
U-72	1940	VIIC	Waldemar Mehl	0	0	0	0	0	0	0	0	0	0	Sunk	30 March 1945	Training boat
U-73	1940	VIIB	Helmut Rosenbaum	4	22,947	0	0	8	43,945	3	22,928	0	0	Sunk	16 December 1943	USS Woolsey and USS Trippe
U-74	1940	VIIB	Eitel-Friedrich Kentrat	1	925	1	11,402	4	24,694	1	123	0	0	Sunk	2 May 1942	HMS Wishart, and HMS Wrestler
U-75	1940	VIIB		2	744	0	0	7	37,884	0	0	0	0	Sunk	28 December 1941	HMS Kipling
U-76	1940	VIIB		0	0	0	0	2	7,290	0	0	0	0	Sunk	5 April 1941	HMS Wolverine and HMS Scarborough
U-77	1940	VIIC	Heinrich Schonder	1	1,050	2	2,880	14	31,171	2	5,384	2	11,637	Sunk	29 March 1943	RAF Hudson
U-78	1940	VIIC		0	0	0	0	0	0	0	0	0	0	Sunk	16 April 1945	Enemy artillery
U-79	1941	VIIC		1	625	0	0	2	2,983	1	10,356	0	0	Sunk	23 December 1941	HMS Hasty and HMS Hotspur
U-80	1941	VIIC	Georg Staats	0	0	0	0	0	0	0	0	0	0	Sunk	28 November 1944	Accident
U-81	1941	VIIC	Friedrich Guggenberger, Johann-Otto Krieg	2	23,750	0	0	24	41,784	1	6,671	1	7,472	Scrapped	22 April 1944	Enemy aircraft bomb damage
U-82	1941	VIIC		1	1,190	0	0	8	51,859	1	1,999	0	0	Sunk	6 February 1942	HMS Rochester and HMS Tamarisk
U-83	1941	VIIB	Hans-Werner Kraus	1	96	1	6,746	5	8,425	1	2,590	0	0	Sunk	4 March 1943	RAF Hudson
U-84	1941	VIIB		0	0	0	0	6	29,905	1	7,176	0	0	Sunk	7 August 1943	US Liberator
U-85	1941	VIIB		0	0	0	0	3	15,060	0	0	0	0	Sunk	14 April 1942	USS Roper
U-86	1941	VIIB		0	0	0	0	3	9,614	1	8,627	0	0	Sunk	29 November 1943	HMS Tumult and HMS Rocket
U-87	1941	VIIB		0	0	0	0	5	38,014	0	0	0	0	Sunk	4 March 1943	HMCS Shediac and HMCS St. Croix
U-88	1941	VIIC		0	0	0	0	2	12,304	0	0	0	0	Sunk	12 September 1942	HMS Faulknor
U-89	1941	VIIC		0	0	0	0	4	13,815	0	0	0	0	Sunk	12 May 1943	Fairey Swordfish aircraft, HMS Broadway and HMS Lagan
U-90	1941	VIIC		0	0	0	0	0	0	0	0	0	0	Sunk	24 July 1942	HMCS St. Croix
U-91	1941	VIIC		1	1,375	0	0	4	26,194	0	0	0	0	Sunk	26 February 1944	HMS Affleck, HMS Gore and HMS Gould
U-92	1942	VIIC		1	1,625	0	0	2	17,612	1	9,348	0	0	Scrapped	1944 – 45	
U-93	1940	VIIC	Claus Korth	0	0	0	0	8	43,392	0	0	0	0	Sunk	15 January 1942	HMS Hesperus
U-94	1940	VIIC	Otto Ites, Herbert Kuppisch	0	0	0	0	26	141,852	1	8,022	0	0	Sunk	28 August 1942	US Catalina & HMCS Oakville
U-95	1940	VIIC		0	0	0	0	8	28,415	4	27,916	0	0	Sunk	28 November 1941	O 21
U-96	1940	VIIC	Heinrich Lehmann-Willenbrock, Hans-Jürgen Hellriegel, Heinrich Schroeteler	0	0	0	0	27	181,206	4	33,043	1	8,888	Sunk	30 March 1945	Film 'Das Boot'
U-97	1940	VIIC		1	6,833	0	0	15	64,404	1	9,718	0	0	Sunk	16 June 1943	RAAF Hudson
U-98	1940	VIIC	Robert Gysae	1	10,549	1	185	10	48,878	0	0	0	0	Sunk	15 November 1942	HMS Wrestler
U-99	1940	VIIB	Otto Kretschmer	3	46,440	0	0	35	198,218	5	37,965	0	0	Sunk	17 March 1941	HMS Walker
U-100	1940	VIIB	Joachim Schepke	0	0	0	0	25	135,614	4	17,229	1	2,205	Sunk	17 March 1941	HMS Vanoc
U-101	1940	VIIB	Fritz Frauenheim, Ernst Mengersen, Karl-Heinz Marbach, Egon-Reiner von Schlippenbach	1	1,190	0	0	22	111,673	2	9,113	0	0	Scuttled	3 May 1945	
U-102	1940	VIIB		0	0	0	0	1	5,219	0	0	0	0	Sunk	1 July 1940	HMS Vansittart
U-103	1940	IXB	Viktor Schütze, Werner Winter	0	0	0	0	45	237,596	3	28,158	0	0	Scuttled	3 May 1945	
U-104	1940	IXB		0	0	0	0	1	8,240	1	10,516	0	0	Sunk	28 November 1940	Struck a mine
U-105	1940	IXB	Georg Schewe	1	1,546	0	0	22	123,924	0	0	0	0	Sunk	2 June 1943	Free French Potez-CAMS 141 flying boat
U-106	1940	IXB	Jürgen Oesten, Hermann Rasch	0	0	2	39,346	22	138,581	2	12,634	0	0	Sunk	2 August 1943	RAAF Sunderland
U-107	1940	IXB	Günter Hessler, Harald Gelhaus	2	10,411	1	8,246	37	207,375	3	17,392	0	0	Sunk	18 August 1944	RAF Sunderland
U-108	1940	IXB	Klaus Scholtz	1	16,644	0	0	25	118,722	0	0	0	0	Scuttled	11 April 1944	Air raid
U-109	1940	IXB	Heinrich Bleichrodt	0	0	0	0	12	79,969	1	6,548	0	0	Sunk	4 May 1943	RAF Liberator
U-110	1940	IXB	Fritz-Julius Lemp	0	0	0	0	3	10,149	2	8,675	0	0	Captured	9 May 1941	HMS Aubrietia, HMS Broadway, HMS Bulldog
U-111	1940	IXB	Wilhelm Kleinschmidt	0	0	0	0	4	24,176	1	13,037	0	0	Sunk	4 October 1941	HMS Lady Shirley
U-116	1941	XB		0	0	0	0	1	4,284	1	7,093	0	0	Missing	6 October 1942	
U-117	1941	XB		0	0	0	0	0	0	1	7,177	1	7,092	Sunk	7 August 1943	US Avenger aircraft
U-118	1941	XB		1	925	0	0	3	14,064	2	11,945	0	0	Sunk	12 June 1943	US Avenger aircraft
U-119	1942	XB		0	0	0	0	1	2,937	1	7,176	0	0	Sunk	24 June 1943	HMS Starling
U-120	1940	IIB	Ernst Bauer	0	0	0	0	0	0	0	0	0	0	Scuttled	5 May 1945	
U-121	1940	IIB	Karl-Ernst Schroeter, Adalbert Schnee, Egon-Reiner von Schlippenbach, Otto Westphalen	0	0	0	0	0	0	0	0	0	0	Scuttled	5 May 1945	Training boat
U-122	1939	IXB		0	0	0	0	1	5,911	0	0	0	0	Missing	22 June 1940	
U-123	1940	IXB	Karl-Heinz Moehle, Reinhard Hardegen, Horst von Schroeter, Walter Käding, Herbert Schneider	2	3,892	1	13,984	42	218,813	5	39,584	0	0	Scuttled	19 August 1944	
U-124	1940	IXB	Georg-Wilhelm Schulz, Johann Mohr, Werner Henke	2	5,775	0	0	46	219,862	4	30,067	0	0	Sunk	2 April 1943	HMS Stonecrop and HMS Black Swan
U-125	1940	IXC	Günther Kuhnke, Ulrich Folkers	0	0	0	0	17	82,873	0	0	0	0	Sunk	6 May 1943	HMS Oribi and HMS Snowflake
U-126	1940	IXC	Ernst Bauer	1	450	0	0	24	111,564	5	37,501	2	14,173	Sunk	3 July 1943	RAF Wellington
U-127	1941	IXC		0	0	0	0	0	0	0	0	0	0	Sunk	15 December 1941	HMAS Nestor
U-128	1941	IXC	Ulrich Heyse	0	0	0	0	12	83,639	0	0	0	0	Sunk	17 May 1943	USS Moffett & USS Jouett
U-129	1941	IXC	Asmus Nicolai Clausen, Hans Witt	0	0	0	0	29	143,748	0	0	0	0	Scuttled	18 August 1944	Taken out of service
U-130	1941	IXC	Ernst Kals	3	34,407	0	0	21	127,608	1	6,986	0	0	Sunk	12 March 1943	USS Champlin
U-131	1941	IXC		0	0	0	0	1	4,016	0	0	0	0	Scuttled	17 December 1941	HMS Exmoor, HMS Blankney, HMS Stanley, HMS Pentstemon, HMS Stork, FAA Martlet aircraft
U-132	1941	VIIC		2	2,773	0	0	7	32,356	1	6,690	1	4,367	Sunk	4 November 1942	Caught in blast
U-133	1941	VIIC		1	1,920	0	0	0	0	0	0	0	0	Sunk	14 March 1942	Struck a mine
U-134	1941	VIIC		0	0	0	0	3	12,147	0	0	0	0	Sunk	27 August 1943	HMS Rother
U-135	1941	VIIC		0	0	0	0	3	21,302	1	4,762	0	0	Sunk	15 July 1943	HMS Rochester, HMS Mignonette, HMS Balsam & US Catalina
U-136	1941	VIIC		2	1,850	0	0	5	23,649	1	8,955	0	0	Sunk	11 July 1942	FFL Léopard, HMS Spey and HMS Pelican
U-137	1940	IID	Herbert Wohlfarth	1	10,552	0	0	6	24,136	1	4,917	0	0	Scuttled	5 May 1945	
U-138	1940	IID	Wolfgang Lüth	0	0	0	0	6	48,564	1	6,993	0	0	Scuttled	18 June 1941	HMS Faulknor, HMS Fearless, HMS Forester, HMS Foresight and HMS Foxhound
U-139	1940	IID	Robert Bartels, Albert Lauzemis	0	0	0	0	0	0	0	0	0	0	Scuttled	5 May 1945	Training boat
U-140	1940	IID	Hans-Jürgen Hellriegel	1	206	0	0	3	12,410	0	0	0	0	Scuttled	5 May 1945	Training boat
U-141	1940	IID	Heinz-Otto Schultze	0	0	0	0	4	6,801	1	5,133	0	0	Scuttled	5 May 1945	
U-142	1940	IID	Asmus Nicolai Clausen, Johann-Otto Krieg	0	0	0	0	0	0	0	0	0	0	Scuttled	5 May 1945	Training boat
U-143	1940	IID	Ernst Mengersen, Helmut Möhlmann, Harald Gelhaus, Jürgen von Rosenstiel	0	0	0	0	1	1,409	0	0	0	0	Sunk	22 December 1945	Operation Deadlight
U-144	1940	IID		1	206	0	0	0	0	0	0	0	0	Sunk	10 August 1941	Soviet submarine Shch-307
U-145	1940	IID		0	0	0	0	0	0	0	0	0	0	Sunk	22 December 1945	Operation Deadlight
U-146	1940	IID	Otto Ites	0	0	0	0	1	3,496	0	0	0	0	Scuttled	5 May 1945	
U-147	1940	IID	Reinhard Hardegen	0	0	0	0	2	6,145	1	4,996	1	2,491	Sunk	2 June 1941	HMS Wanderer and HMS Periwinkle
U-148	1940	IID		0	0	0	0	0	0	0	0	0	0	Scuttled	5 May 1945	Training boat
U-149	1940	IID	Horst Höltring	1	206	0	0	0	0	0	0	0	0	Sunk	21 December 1945	Operation Deadlight
U-150	1940	IID		0	0	0	0	0	0	0	0	0	0	Sunk	21 December 1945	Operation Deadlight
U-151	1940	IID		0	0	0	0	0	0	0	0	0	0	Scuttled	5 May 1945	Training boat
U-152	1940	IID	Peter-Erich Cremer	0	0	0	0	0	0	0	0	0	0	Scuttled	5 May 1945	Training boat
U-153	1941	IXC		0	0	0	0	3	16,186	0	0	0	0	Sunk	13 July 1943	USS Lansdowne
U-154	1941	IXC		0	0	0	0	10	49,288	2	15,771	1	8,166	Sunk	3 July 1944	USS Inch & USS Frost
U-155	1941	IXC	Adolf Piening, Ludwig von Friedeburg	1	13,785	1	6,736	25	126,664	0	0	0	0	Sunk	21 December 1945	Operation Deadlight
U-156	1941	IXC	Werner Hartenstein	0	0	1	1,190	19	97,489	3	18,811	0	0	Sunk	8 March 1943	US Catalina
U-157	1941	IXC		0	0	0	0	1	6,401	0	0	0	0	Sunk	13 June 1942	USCGC Thetis
U-158	1941	IXC	Erwin Rostin	0	0	0	0	17	101,321	2	15,264	0	0	Sunk	30 June 1942	US Mariner
U-159	1941	IXC	Helmut Witte	0	0	0	0	23	119,554	1	265	0	0	Sunk	28 July 1943	US Mariner
U-160	1941	IXC	Georg Lassen	1	730	0	0	25	155,352	5	34,419	0	0	Sunk	14 July 1943	US Avenger & Wildcat aircraft
U-161	1941	IXC	Hans Witt, Albrecht Achilles	1	1,130	1	5,450	12	60,107	5	35,672	1	3,305	Sunk	27 September 1943	US Mariner
U-162	1941	IXC	Jürgen Wattenberg	0	0	0	0	14	82,027	0	0	0	0	Sunk	3 September 1942	HMS Vimy, HMS Pathfinder and HMS Quentin
U-163	1941	IXC		1	2,000	0	0	3	15,011	0	0	0	0	Sunk	13 March 1943	HMCS Prescott
U-164	1941	IXC		0	0	0	0	3	8,133	0	0	0	0	Sunk	6 January 1943	US Catalina
U-165	1941	IXC		1	358	1	7,252	2	8,396	3	14,499	0	0	Sunk	27 September 1942	RAF Wellington
U-166	1941	IXC		0	0	0	0	4	7,593	0	0	0	0	Sunk	30 July 1942	US Navy patrol craft PC-566
U-167	1942	IXC/40		0	0	0	0	1	5,449	1	7,200	0	0	Scuttled	6 April 1943	Following air attack
U-168	1941	IXC/40		1	1,440	0	0	2	6,568	1	9,804	0	0	Sunk	6 October 1944	HNLMS Zwaardvisch
U-169	1942	IXC/40		0	0	0	0	0	0	0	0	0	0	Sunk	27 March 1943	RAF Fortress
U-170	1942	IXC/40		0	0	0	0	1	4,663	0	0	0	0	Sunk	30 November 1945	Operation Deadlight
U-171	1941	IXC		0	0	0	0	3	17,641	0	0	0	0	Sunk	9 October 1942	Struck a mine
U-172	1941	IXC	Carl Emmermann	0	0	0	0	26	152,080	0	0	0	0	Sunk	13 December 1943	USS George E. Badger, USS Clemson, USS Osmond Ingram, USS Du Pont plus US Grumman Avenger and Grumman Wildcat aircraft
U-173	1941	IXC		1	9,359	3	19,915	0	0	0	0	0	0	Sunk	16 November 1942	USS Woolsey, USS Swanson, and USS Quick
U-174	1941	IXC		0	0	0	0	5	30,813	0	0	0	0	Sunk	27 April 1943	US Lockheed Ventura
U-175	1941	IXC		0	0	0	0	10	40,619	0	0	0	0	Sunk	17 April 1943	USCGC Spencer
U-176	1941	IXC		0	0	0	0	11	53,307	0	0	0	0	Sunk	15 May 1943	Cuban patrol boat CS 13
U-177	1941	IXD2	Robert Gysae	0	0	0	0	14	87,388	1	2,588	0	0	Sunk	6 February 1944	US Liberator
U-178	1941	IXD2	Wilhelm Dommes	0	0	0	0	13	87,030	1	6,348	0	0	Scuttled	25 August 1944	Escape capture
U-179	1941	IXD2		0	0	0	0	1	6,558	0	0	0	0	Sunk	8 October 1942	HMS Active
U-180	1941	IXD1		0	0	0	0	2	13,298	0	0	0	0	Missing	23 August 1944	Possible schnorkel problems
U-181	1941	IXD2	Wolfgang Lüth	0	0	0	0	27	138,779	0	0	0	0	Scuttled	12 February 1946	Taken over by Japan I-501
U-182	1942	IXD2	Asmus Nicolai Clausen	0	0	0	0	5	30,071	0	0	0	0	Sunk	16 May 1943	USS MacKenzie
U-183	1942	IXC/40		0	0	0	0	4	19,260	0	0	1	6,993	Sunk	23 April 1945	USS Besugo
U-184	1942	IXC/40		0	0	0	0	1	3,192	0	0	0	0	Missing	21 November 1942	
U-185	1942	IXC/40	August Maus	0	0	0	0	9	62,761	1	6,840	0	0	Sunk	24 August 1943	US Avenger & Wildcat aircraft
U-186	1942	IXC/40		0	0	0	0	3	18,782	0	0	0	0	Sunk	12 May 1943	HMS Hesperus
U-187	1941	IXC/40		0	0	0	0	0	0	0	0	0	0	Sunk	4 February 1943	HMS Vimy & HMS Beverley
U-188	1942	IXC/40	Siegfried Lüdden	1	1,190	0	0	8	49,725	1	9,977	0	0	Scuttled	25 August 1944	Prevent Allied capture
U-189	1942	IXC/40		0	0	0	0	0	0	0	0	0	0	Sunk	23 April 1943	RAF Liberator
U-190	1942	IXC/40		1	590	0	0	1	7,015	0	0	0	0	Surrendered	14 May 1945	
U-191	1942	IXC/40		0	0	0	0	1	3,025	0	0	0	0	Sunk	23 April 1943	HMS Hesperus
U-192	1942	IXC/40		0	0	0	0	0	0	0	0	0	0	Sunk	6 May 1943	HMS Loosestrife
U-193	1942	IXC/40		0	0	0	0	1	10,172	0	0	0	0	Missing	24 April 1944	
U-194	1942	IXC/40		0	0	0	0	0	0	0	0	0	0	Sunk	24 June 1943	US Catalina
U-195	1942	IXD1		0	0	0	0	2	14,391	1	6,797	0	0	Surrendered	August 1945	Became Japanese sub I-506
U-196	1942	IXD2	Eitel-Friedrich Kentrat	0	0	0	0	3	17,739	0	0	0	0	Missing	1 December 1944	
U-197	1942	IXD2	Robert Bartels	0	0	0	0	3	21,267	1	7,181	0	0	Sunk	20 August 1943	RAF Catalina
U-198	1942	IXD2	Werner Hartmann	0	0	0	0	11	59,690	0	0	0	0	Sunk	12 August 1944	HMS Findhorn & HMIS Godavari
U-199	1942	IXD2	Hans-Werner Kraus	0	0	0	0	2	4,181	0	0	0	0	Sunk	31 July 1943	US PBM Mariner& Brazilian Lockheed Hudson aircraft
U-200	1942	IXD2	Heinrich Schonder	0	0	0	0	0	0	0	0	0	0	Sunk	24 June 1943	RAF Liberator
U-201	1940	VIIC	Adalbert Schnee	2	5,700	0	0	22	102,697	2	13,386	0	0	Sunk	17 February 1943	HMS Viscount
U-202	1941	VIIC		0	0	0	0	9	34,615	4	35,427	0	0	Sunk	2 June 1943	HMS Starling
U-203	1941	VIIC	Rolf Mützelburg	0	0	0	0	21	94,270	3	17,052	0	0	Sunk	25 April 1943	RN Swordfish & HMS Pathfinder
U-204	1941	VIIC		1	1,060	0	0	4	17,157	0	0	0	0	Sunk	19 October 1941	HMS Mallow & HMS Rochester
U-205	1941	VIIC		1	5,450	0	0	0	0	0	0	0	0	Sunk	17 February 1943	HMS Paladin & SAAF Blenheim
U-206	1941	VIIC		1	925	0	0	2	3,283	0	0	0	0	Missing	29 November 1941	Possibly struck a mine
U-207	1941	VIIC		0	0	0	0	2	9,727	0	0	0	0	Sunk	11 September 1941	HMS Leamington & HMS Veteran
U-208	1941	VIIC		0	0	0	0	1	3,872	0	0	0	0	Sunk	7 December 1941	HMS Harvester & HMS Hesperus
U-209	1941	VIIC		0	0	0	0	3	1,136	0	0	1	220	Missing	7 May 1943	Possible diving accident
U-210	1941	VIIC		0	0	0	0	0	0	0	0	0	0	Sunk	6 August 1942	HMCS Assiniboine
U-211	1942	VIIC		1	1,350	0	0	0	0	3	31,883	0	0	Sunk	19 November 1943	RAF Wellington
U-212	1942	VIIC		0	0	0	0	1	80	0	0	0	0	Sunk	21 July 1944	HMS Curzon & HMS Ekins
U-213	1941	VIID		0	0	0	0	0	0	0	0	0	0	Sunk	31 July 1942	HMS Erne, HMS Rochester and HMS Sandwich
U-214	1941	VIID		1	1,525	1	10,552	3	18,266	1	6,507	0	0	Sunk	26 July 1944	HMS Cooke
U-215	1941	VIID		0	0	0	0	1	7,191	0	0	0	0	Sunk	3 July 1942	HMS Le Tiger
U-216	1941	VIID		0	0	0	0	1	4,989	0	0	0	0	Sunk	20 October 1942	RAF Liberator
U-217	1941	VIID		0	0	0	0	3	10,651	0	0	0	0	Sunk	5 June 1943	US Avenger
U-218	1941	VIID		0	0	1	7,177	2	346	1	7,361	0	0	Sunk	4 December 1945	Operation Deadlight
U-219	1942	XB		0	0	0	0	0	0	0	0	0	0	Surrendered	August 1945	Became Japanese sub I-505
U-220	1943	XB		0	0	0	0	2	7,199	0	0	0	0	Sunk	28 October 1943	US Avenger & Wildcat aircraft
U-221	1942	VIIC	Hans-Hartwig Trojer	10	759	0	0	11	69,589	1	7,197	0	0	Sunk	27 September 1943	RAF Halifax
U-222	1942	VIIC		0	0	0	0	0	0	0	0	0	0	Sunk	2 September 1942	Collision accident
U-223	1942	VIIC		2	3,235	0	0	2	12,556	0	0	1	4,970	Sunk	30 March 1944	HMS Tumult, HMS Laforey, HMS Hambledon and HMS Blencathra
U-224	1942	VIIC		0	0	0	0	2	9,535	0	0	0	0	Sunk	13 January 1943	HMCS Ville de Quebec
U-225	1942	VIIC		0	0	0	0	1	5,273	4	24,672	0	0	Sunk	22 February 1943	HMS Dianthus
U-226	1942	VIIC		0	0	0	0	1	7,134	0	0	0	0	Sunk	6 November 1943	HMS Starling, HMS Woodcock and HMS Kite
U-227	1942	VIIC		0	0	0	0	0	0	0	0	0	0	Sunk	30 April 1943	RAAF Hampden
U-228	1942	VIIC		0	0	0	0	0	0	0	0	0	0	Broken up	1944 – 1945	Shot down 2 aircraft
U-229	1942	VIIC		0	0	0	0	2	8,352	1	3,670	0	0	Sunk	22 September 1943	HMS Keppel
U-230	1942	VIIC	Herbert Werner	3	3,585	0	0	1	2,868	0	0	0	0	Scuttled	21 August 1944	Ran aground
U-231	1942	VIIC		0	0	0	0	0	0	0	0	0	0	Sunk	13 January 1944	RAF Wellington
U-232	1942	VIIC		0	0	0	0	0	0	0	0	0	0	Sunk	9 July 1943	RAF Wellington
U-233	1943	XB		0	0	0	0	0	0	0	0	0	0	Sunk	5 July 1944	USS Baker & USS Thomas
U-234	1943	XB		0	0	0	0	0	0	0	0	0	0	Surrendered	19 May 1945	Portsmouth, New Hampshire
U-235	1942	VIIC		0	0	0	0	0	0	0	0	0	0	Sunk	14 April 1945	Friendly fire from German torpedo boat
U-236	1942	VIIC		0	0	0	0	0	0	0	0	0	0	Scuttled	5 May 1945	
U-237	1942	VIIC		0	0	0	0	0	0	0	0	0	0	Sunk	4 April 1945	Air raid
U-238	1943	VIIC		0	0	0	0	4	23,048	1	7,176	0	0	Sunk	9 February 1944	HMS Kite, HMS Magpie and HMS Starling
U-239	1943	VIIC		0	0	0	0	0	0	0	0	0	0	Broken up	1944	Air raid
U-240	1943	VIIC		0	0	0	0	0	0	0	0	0	0	Missing	15 May 1944	Lost without trace
U-241	1943	VIIC		0	0	0	0	0	0	0	0	0	0	Sunk	18 May 1944	RAF Catalina
U-242	1943	VIIC		1	500	0	0	2	2,095	0	0	0	0	Sunk	5 April 1945	Struck a mine
U-243	1943	VIIC		0	0	0	0	0	0	0	0	0	0	Sunk	8 July 1944	RAAF Sunderland
U-244	1943	VIIC		0	0	0	0	0	0	0	0	0	0	Surrendered	14 May 1945	Operation Deadlight
U-245	1943	VIIC		0	0	0	0	3	17,087	0	0	0	0	Surrendered	9 May 1945	Operation Deadlight
U-246	1943	VIIC		0	0	0	0	0	0	0	0	0	0	Sunk	17 March 1945	
U-247	1943	VIIC		0	0	0	0	1	207	0	0	0	0	Sunk	1 September 1944	HMCS Swansea & HMCS Saint John
U-248	1943	VIIC		0	0	0	0	0	0	0	0	0	0	Sunk	16 January 1945	USS Hayter, USS Otter, USS Varian and USS Hubbard
U-249	1943	VIIC		0	0	0	0	0	0	0	0	0	0	Surrendered	10 May 1945	Operation Deadlight
U-250	1943	VIIC		1	56	0	0	0	0	0	0	0	0	Sunk	30 July 1944	Enemy action. Later raised and served as Soviet sub TS-14
U-251	1941	VIIC	Heinrich Timm	0	0	0	0	2	11,408	0	0	0	0	Sunk	19 April 1945	RAF Mosquito
U-252	1941	VIIC		0	0	0	0	1	1,355	0	0	0	0	Sunk	14 April 1942	HMS Stork & HMS Vetch
U-253	1941	VIIC		0	0	0	0	0	0	0	0	0	0	Sunk	25 September 1942	Struck a mine
U-254	1941	VIIC		0	0	0	0	3	18,553	0	0	0	0	Sunk	8 December 1942	Collision accident
U-255	1941	VIIC	Reinhart Reche	1	1,200	0	0	10	47,640	0	0	1	7,191	Surrendered	17 May 1945	Operation Deadlight
U-256	1941	VIIC	Heinrich Lehmann-Willenbrock	1	1,300	0	0	0	0	0	0	0	0	Decommissioned	23 October 1944	Later captured
U-257	1941	VIIC		0	0	0	0	0	0	0	0	0	0	Sunk	24 February 1944	HMCS Waskesiu & HMS Nene
U-258	1941	VIIC		0	0	0	0	1	6,198	0	0	0	0	Sunk	20 May 1943	RAF Liberator
U-259	1941	VIIC		0	0	0	0	0	0	0	0	0	0	Sunk	15 November 1942	RAF Hudson
U-260	1942	VIIC		0	0	0	0	1	4,893	0	0	0	0	Sunk	12 March 1945	Struck a mine
U-261	1942	VIIC		0	0	0	0	0	0	0	0	0	0	Sunk	15 September 1942	RAF Whitley depth charges
U-262	1942	VIIC	Heinz Franke	1	925	0	0	3	13,010	0	0	0	0	Stricken	2 April 1945	Bomb damage
U-263	1942	VIIC		0	0	0	0	2	12,376	0	0	0	0	Sunk	20 January 1944	Diving accident
U-264	1942	VIIC		0	0	0	0	3	16,843	0	0	0	0	Sunk	19 February 1944	HMS Woodpecker & HMS Starling
U-265	1942	VIIC		0	0	0	0	0	0	0	0	0	0	Sunk	3 February 1943	RAF Fortress
U-266	1942	VIIC		0	0	0	0	4	16,089	0	0	0	0	Sunk	15 May 1943	RAF Halifax
U-267	1942	VIIC		0	0	0	0	0	0	0	0	0	0	Scuttled	5 May 1945	
U-268	1942	VIIC		3	873	0	0	1	14,547	0	0	0	0	Sunk	19 February 1943	RAF Wellington
U-269	1942	VIIC		0	0	0	0	0	0	0	0	0	0	Sunk	25 June 1944	HMS Bickerton
U-270	1942	VIIC		1	1,370	0	0	0	0	0	0	0	0	Sunk	13 August 1944	RAAF Sunderland
U-271	1942	VIIC		0	0	0	0	0	0	0	0	0	0	Sunk	28 January 1944	US Liberator
U-272	1942	VIIC		0	0	0	0	0	0	0	0	0	0	Sunk	12 November 1942	Collision accident
U-273	1942	VIIC		0	0	0	0	0	0	0	0	0	0	Sunk	19 May 1943	RAF Hudson
U-274	1942	VIIC		0	0	0	0	0	0	0	0	0	0	Sunk	23 October 1943	HMS Duncan , HMS Vidette & RAF Liberator
U-275	1942	VIIC		1	1,090	0	0	1	4,934	0	0	0	0	Sunk	10 March 1945	Struck a mine
U-276	1942	VIIC		0	0	0	0	0	0	0	0	0	0	Sunk	3 May 1945	Air-to-ground rocket damage
U-277	1942	VIIC		0	0	0	0	0	0	0	0	0	0	Sunk	1 May 1944	RN Swordfish
U-278	1942	VIIC		1	1,810	0	0	1	7,177	0	0	0	0	Surrendered	9 May 1945	
U-279	1942	VIIC		0	0	0	0	0	0	0	0	0	0	Sunk	4 October 1943	USAAF Ventura
U-280	1943	VIIC		0	0	0	0	0	0	0	0	0	0	Sunk	16 November 1943	RAF Liberator
U-281	1943	VIIC		0	0	0	0	0	0	0	0	0	0	Surrendered	9 May 1945	Operation Deadlight
U-282	1943	VIIC		0	0	0	0	0	0	0	0	0	0	Sunk	29 October 1943	HMS Duncan , HMS Vidette & HMS Sunflower
U-283	1943	VIIC		0	0	0	0	0	0	0	0	0	0	Sunk	11 February 1944	RCAF Wellington
U-284	1943	VIIC		0	0	0	0	0	0	0	0	0	0	Scuttled	21 December 1943	Sea damage
U-285	1943	VIIC		0	0	0	0	0	0	0	0	0	0	Sunk	15 April 1945	HMS Grindall & HMS Keats
U-286	1943	VIIC		1	1,150	0	0	0	0	0	0	0	0	Sunk	29 April 1945	HMS Loch Insh, HMS Anguilla and HMS Cotton
U-287	1943	VIIC		0	0	0	0	0	0	0	0	0	0	Sunk	16 May 1945	Struck a mine
U-288	1943	VIIC		0	0	0	0	0	0	0	0	0	0	Sunk	3 April 1944	RN Fairey Swordfish & Martlet aircraft
U-289	1943	VIIC		0	0	0	0	0	0	0	0	0	0	Sunk	31 May 1944	HMS Milne
U-290	1943	VIIC		0	0	0	0	0	0	0	0	0	0	Scuttled	5 May 1945	
U-291	1943	VIIC		0	0	0	0	0	0	0	0	0	0	Surrendered	5 May 1945	Operation Deadlight
U-292	1943	VIIC/41		0	0	0	0	0	0	0	0	0	0	Sunk	27 May 1944	RAF Liberator
U-293	1943	VIIC/41		0	0	1	1,658	0	0	0	0	0	0	Surrendered	11 May 1945	Operation Deadlight
U-294	1943	VIIC/41		0	0	0	0	0	0	0	0	0	0	Surrendered	9 May 1945	Operation Deadlight
U-295	1943	VIIC/41		0	0	1	1,150	0	0	0	0	0	0	Surrendered	9 May 1945	Operation Deadlight
U-296	1943	VIIC/41		0	0	0	0	0	0	0	0	0	0	Sunk	12 March 1945	Struck a mine
U-297	1943	VIIC/41		0	0	0	0	0	0	0	0	0	0	Sunk	6 December 1944	RAF Sunderland
U-298	1943	VIIC/41		0	0	0	0	0	0	0	0	0	0	Surrendered	9 May 1945	Operation Deadlight
U-299	1943	VIIC/41		0	0	0	0	0	0	0	0	0	0	Surrendered	9 May 1945	Operation Deadlight
U-300	1943	VIIC/41		0	0	0	0	2	7,559	1	7,176	1	9,551	Sunk	22 February 1945	HMS Recruit, HMS Pincher and HMS Evadne
U-301	1942	VIIC		0	0	0	0	0	0	0	0	0	0	Sunk	21 January 1943	British sub HMS Sahib
U-302	1942	VIIC		0	0	0	0	3	12,697	0	0	0	0	Sunk	6 April 1944	HMS Swale
U-303	1942	VIIC		0	0	0	0	1	4,959	0	0	0	0	Sunk	21 May 1943	British sub HMS Sickle
U-304	1942	VIIC		0	0	0	0	0	0	0	0	0	0	Sunk	28 May 1943	RAF Liberator
U-305	1942	VIIC		2	2,560	0	0	2	13,045	0	0	0	0	Sunk	16 January 1944	Accident
U-306	1942	VIIC		0	0	0	0	1	10,218	2	11,195	0	0	Sunk	31 October 1943	HMS Whitehall & HMS Geranium
U-307	1942	VIIC		0	0	0	0	2	7,226	0	0	0	0	Sunk	29 April 1945	HMS Loch Insh
U-308	1942	VIIC		0	0	0	0	0	0	0	0	0	0	Sunk	4 June 1943	British sub HMS Truculent
U-309	1942	VIIC		0	0	0	0	0	0	0	0	1	7,219	Sunk	16 February 1945	HMCS Saint John
U-310	1943	VIIC		0	0	0	0	2	14,395	0	0	0	0	Surrendered	9 May 1945	Scrapped in Norway 1947
U-311	1943	VIIC		0	0	0	0	1	10,342	0	0	0	0	Sunk	22 April 1944	HMCS Matane and HMCS Swansea
U-312	1943	VIIC		0	0	0	0	0	0	0	0	0	0	Surrendered	9 May 1945	Operation Deadlight
U-313	1943	VIIC		0	0	0	0	0	0	0	0	0	0	Surrendered	9 May 1945	Operation Deadlight
U-314	1943	VIIC		0	0	0	0	0	0	0	0	0	0	Sunk	30 January 1944	HMS Whitehall & HMS Meteor
U-315	1943	VIIC		1	1,370	0	0	1	6,996	0	0	0	0	Surrendered	9 May 1945	Scrapped in Norway 1947
U-316	1943	VIIC	Hermann Stuckmann	0	0	0	0	0	0	0	0	0	0	Scuttled	2 May 1945	Training boat
U-317	1943	VIIC/41		0	0	0	0	0	0	0	0	0	0	Sunk	26 June 1944	RAF Liberator
U-318	1943	VIIC/41		0	0	0	0	0	0	0	0	0	0	Surrendered	9 May 1945	Operation Deadlight
U-319	1943	VIIC/41		0	0	0	0	0	0	0	0	0	0	Sunk	15 July 1944	RAF Liberator
U-320	1943	VIIC/41		0	0	0	0	0	0	0	0	0	0	Scuttled	8 May 1945	
U-321	1943	VIIC/41		0	0	0	0	0	0	0	0	0	0	Sunk	2 April 1945	Polish Wellington bomber
U-322	1943	VIIC/41		0	0	0	0	1	5,149	0	0	2	14,367	Sunk	29 December 1944	HMCS Calgary
U-323	1944	VIIC/41		0	0	0	0	0	0	0	0	0	0	Scuttled	5 May 1945	
U-324	1944	VIIC/41		0	0	0	0	0	0	0	0	0	0	Surrendered	9 May 1945	Scrapped in Norway 1947
U-325	1944	VIIC/41		0	0	0	0	0	0	0	0	0	0	Sunk	30 April 1945	Struck a mine
U-326	1944	VIIC/41		0	0	0	0	0	0	0	0	0	0	Sunk	30 April 1945	US PBY Catalina
U-327	1944	VIIC/41		0	0	0	0	0	0	0	0	0	0	Sunk	3 February 1945	HMS Bayntun, HMS Braithwaite and HMS Loch Eck
U-328	1944	VIIC/41		0	0	0	0	0	0	0	0	0	0	Surrendered	9 May 1945	Operation Deadlight
U-331	1940	VIIC	Hans-Diedrich von Tiesenhausen	2	40,235	1	372	0	0	0	0	0	0	Sunk	17 November 1942	RN Fairey Albacore aircraft
U-332	1941	VIIC		0	0	0	0	8	46,729	1	5,964	0	0	Sunk	29 April 1943	RAF Liberator
U-333	1941	VIIC	Peter-Erich Cremer	0	0	1	925	7	32,107	1	8,327	0	0	Sunk	31 July 1944	First use of Squid. HMS Starling and HMS Loch Killin
U-334	1941	VIIC		0	0	0	0	2	14,372	0	0	0	0	Sunk	14 June 1943	HMS Jed & HMS Pelican
U-335	1941	VIIC		0	0	0	0	0	0	0	0	0	0	Sunk	3 August 1942	HMS Saracen
U-336	1941	VIIC		0	0	0	0	1	4,919	0	0	0	0	Sunk	5 October 1943	RAF Hudson
U-337	1942	VIIC		0	0	0	0	0	0	0	0	0	0	Missing	3 January 1943	
U-338	1942	VIIC		0	0	0	0	4	21,927	1	7,134	0	0	Missing	20 September 1943	Possible diving accident
U-339	1942	VIIC		0	0	0	0	0	0	0	0	0	0	Scuttled	5 May 1945	
U-340	1942	VIIC		0	0	0	0	0	0	0	0	0	0	Sunk	2 November 1943	HMS Fleetwood, HMS Active and HMS Witherington and RAF Wellington bomber
U-341	1942	VIIC		0	0	0	0	0	0	0	0	0	0	Sunk	19 September 1943	RCAF Liberator
U-342	1942	VIIC		0	0	0	0	0	0	0	0	0	0	Sunk	17 April 1944	RCAF Canso
U-343	1942	VIIC		0	0	0	0	0	0	0	0	0	0	Sunk	10 March 1944	HMS Mull
U-344	1943	VIIC		1	1,350	0	0	0	0	0	0	0	0	Sunk	22 August 1944	RN Swordfish
U-345	1943	VIIC		0	0	0	0	0	0	0	0	0	0	Stricken	13 December 1943	Bombed in Kiel by US aircraft
U-346	1943	VIIC		0	0	0	0	0	0	0	0	0	0	Sunk	20 September 1943	Diving accident
U-347	1943	VIIC		0	0	0	0	0	0	0	0	0	0	Sunk	17 July 1944	RAF Liberator
U-348	1943	VIIC	Hans-Joachim Förster	0	0	0	0	0	0	0	0	0	0	Sunk	30 March 1945	US aircraft
U-349	1943	VIIC		0	0	0	0	0	0	0	0	0	0	Scuttled	5 May 1945	
U-350	1943	VIIC		0	0	0	0	0	0	0	0	0	0	Sunk	30 March 1945	US aircraft
U-351	1941	VIIC		0	0	0	0	0	0	0	0	0	0	Scuttled	5 May 1945	
U-352	1941	VIIC		0	0	0	0	0	0	0	0	0	0	Sunk	9 May 1942	USCGC Icarus
U-353	1941	VIIC		0	0	0	0	0	0	0	0	0	0	Sunk	16 October 1942	HMS Fame
U-354	1942	VIIC		2	12,720	0	0	1	7,176	1	3,771	0	0	Sunk	24 August 1944	HMS Mermaid, HMS Peacock, HMS Loch Dunvegan and HMS Keppel
U-355	1941	VIIC		0	0	0	0	1	5,082	0	0	0	0	Missing	1 April 1944	
U-356	1941	VIIC		0	0	0	0	3	13,649	1	7,051	0	0	Sunk	27 December 1942	HMS Cygnet, HMCS Chilliwack, HMCS Battleford and HMCS Napanee
U-357	1942	VIIC		0	0	0	0	0	0	0	0	0	0	Sunk	26 December 1942	HMS Hesperus and HMS Vanessa
U-358	1942	VIIC		1	1,192	0	0	4	17,753	0	0	0	0	Sunk	1 March 1944	HMS Gould, HMS Affleck, HMS Gore and HMS Garlies
U-359	1942	VIIC		0	0	0	0	0	0	0	0	0	0	Sunk	26 July 1943	US Mariner
U-360	1942	VIIC		0	0	1	1,540	0	0	1	7,153	0	0	Sunk	2 April 1944	HMS Keppel
U-361	1942	VIIC		0	0	0	0	0	0	0	0	0	0	Sunk	17 July 1944	RAF Catalina
U-362	1942	VIIC		0	0	0	0	0	0	0	0	0	0	Sunk	5 September 1944	Depth charged by Soviet minesweeper T-116
U-363	1942	VIIC		0	0	0	0	0	0	0	0	0	0	Surrendered	9 May 1945	Operation Deadlight
U-364	1943	VIIC		0	0	0	0	0	0	0	0	0	0	Sunk	29 January 1944	RAF Halifax
U-365	1943	VIIC		3	1,355	1	1,710	1	7,540	0	0	0	0	Sunk	13 December 1944	RN Swordfish
U-366	1943	VIIC		0	0	0	0	0	0	0	0	0	0	Sunk	5 March 1944	RN Swordfish
U-367	1943	VIIC		0	0	0	0	0	0	0	0	0	0	Sunk	16 March 1945	Struck a mine
U-368	1943	VIIC		0	0	0	0	0	0	0	0	0	0	Surrendered	5 May 1945	Operation Deadlight
U-369	1943	VIIC		0	0	0	0	0	0	0	0	0	0	Surrendered	9 May 1945	Operation Deadlight
U-370	1943	VIIC		2	832	0	0	0	0	0	0	0	0	Scuttled	5 May 1945	
U-371	1941	VIIC	Waldemar Mehl, Horst-Arno Fenski	3	2,831	2	2,500	8	51,401	4	28,072	2	13,341	Scuttled	4 May 1944	USS Pride, USS Joseph E. Campbell, FFL Sénégalais, and HMS Blankney
U-372	1941	VIIC		1	14,650	0	0	3	11,751	0	0	0	0	Sunk	4 August 1942	HMS Sikh, HMS Zulu, HMS Croome, HMS Tetcott and RAF Wellington
U-373	1941	VIIC		0	0	0	0	3	10,263	0	0	0	0	Sunk	8 June 1944	RAF Liberator
U-374	1941	VIIC		2	992	0	0	1	3,349	0	0	0	0	Sunk	12 January 1942	HMS Unbeaten
U-375	1941	VIIC		0	0	1	2,650	8	8,090	0	0	1	6,288	Missing	25 July 1943	
U-376	1941	VIIC		0	0	0	0	2	10,146	0	0	0	0	Missing	7 April 1943	
U-377	1941	VIIC		0	0	0	0	0	0	0	0	0	0	Sunk	17 January 1944	HMS Wanderer and HMS Glenarm
U-378	1941	VIIC		1	1,920	0	0	0	0	0	0	0	0	Sunk	20 October 1943	USN Avenger and Wildcat aircraft
U-379	1941	VIIC		0	0	0	0	2	8,904	0	0	0	0	Sunk	8 August 1942	HMS Dianthus
U-380	1941	VIIC	Albrecht Brandi	0	0	0	0	2	14,063	1	7,191	1	7,178	Sunk	11 March 1944	US aircraft
U-381	1942	VIIC		0	0	0	0	0	0	0	0	0	0	Missing	10 May 1943	
U-382	1942	VIIC		0	0	0	0	0	0	1	9,811	0	0	Scuttled	5 May 1945	Having earlier been sunk & raised
U-383	1942	VIIC		0	0	0	0	1	423	0	0	0	0	Sunk	1 August 1943	RAF Sunderland
U-384	1942	VIIC		0	0	0	0	2	13,407	0	0	0	0	Sunk	19 March 1943	RAF Fortress
U-385	1942	VIIC		0	0	0	0	0	0	0	0	0	0	Sunk	11 August 1944	RAAF Sunderland and HMS Starling
U-386	1942	VIIC		0	0	0	0	1	1,997	0	0	0	0	Sunk	19 February 1944	HMS Spey
U-387	1942	VIIC		0	0	0	0	0	0	0	0	0	0	Sunk	9 December 1944	HMS Bamborough Castle
U-388	1942	VIIC		0	0	0	0	0	0	0	0	0	0	Sunk	20 June 1943	USAF Catalina
U-389	1942	VIIC		0	0	0	0	0	0	0	0	0	0	Sunk	4 October 1943	RAF Liberator
U-390	1943	VIIC		1	545	0	0	0	0	0	0	0	0	Sunk	5 July 1944	HMS Wanderer and HMS Tavy
U-391	1943	VIIC		0	0	0	0	0	0	0	0	0	0	Sunk	13 December 1943	RAF Liberator
U-392	1943	VIIC		0	0	0	0	0	0	0	0	0	0	Sunk	16 March 1944	HMS Vanoc, HMS Affleck and US Catalina aircraft
U-393	1943	VIIC		0	0	0	0	0	0	0	0	0	0	Scuttled	5 May 1945	After being attacked by US aircraft
U-394	1943	VIIC		0	0	0	0	0	0	0	0	0	0	Sunk	2 September 1944	RN Swordfish,HMS KeppelD84 (6) and HMS Whitehall, HMS Mermaid and HMS Peacock
U-396	1943	VIIC		0	0	0	0	0	0	0	0	0	0	Missing	11 April 1945	Estimated date
U-397	1943	VIIC		0	0	0	0	0	0	0	0	0	0	Scuttled	5 May 1945	
U-398	1943	VIIC		0	0	0	0	0	0	0	0	0	0	Missing	17 April 1945	
U-399	1943	VIIC		0	0	0	0	1	362	0	0	1	7,176	Sunk	26 March 1945	HMS Duckworth
U-400	1944	VIIC		0	0	0	0	0	0	0	0	0	0	Sunk	15 December 1944	Struck a mine
U-401	1940	VIIC		0	0	0	0	0	0	0	0	0	0	Sunk	3 August 1941	HMS Wanderer, HMS St. Albans and HMS Hydrangea
U-402	1940	VIIC	Siegfried von Forstner	1	602	0	0	14	70,434	3	28,682	0	0	Sunk	13 October 1943	USN TBM Avenger & F4F Wildcat aircraft
U-403	1941	VIIC		0	0	0	0	2	12,946	0	0	0	0	Sunk	18 August 1943	RAF Wellington bomber (French aircrew)
U-404	1941	VIIC	Otto von Bülow	1	1,120	0	0	14	71,450	2	16,689	0	0	Sunk	28 July 1943	US & RAF Liberators
U-405	1941	VIIC		3	361	0	0	2	11,841	0	0	0	0	Sunk	1 November 1943	USS Borie
U-406	1941	VIIC		0	0	0	0	1	7,452	3	13,285	0	0	Sunk	18 February 1944	HMS Spey
U-407	1941	VIIC		0	0	2	17,900	3	26,892	1	6,207	1	7,176	Sunk	19 September 1944	HMS Troubridge, HMS Terpsichore and ORP Garland
U-408	1941	VIIC		0	0	0	0	3	19,689	0	0	0	0	Sunk	5 November 1942	US Catalina
U-409	1941	VIIC		1	10	0	0	4	24,961	1	7,519	0	0	Sunk	12 July 1943	HMS Inconstant
U-410	1941	VIIC	Horst-Arno Fenski	2	6,895	0	0	7	47,244	1	7,134	1	3,722	Sunk	11 March 1944	US aircraft
U-411	1941	VIIC		0	0	0	0	0	0	0	0	0	0	Sunk	13 November 1942	RAF Hudson
U-412	1941	VIIC		0	0	0	0	0	0	0	0	0	0	Sunk	22 October 1942	RAF Wellington
U-413	1942	VIIC	Gustav Poel	1	1,100	0	0	5	36,885	0	0	0	0	Sunk	20 August 1944	HMS Wensleydale, HMS Forester and HMS Vidette
U-414	1942	VIIC		0	0	0	0	1	5,979	1	7,134	0	0	Sunk	25 May 1943	HMS Vetch
U-415	1942	VIIC	Herbert Werner	1	1,340	0	0	1	4,917	1	5,486	0	0	Sunk	14 July 1944	Struck a mine
U-416	1942	VIIC		0	0	0	0	0	0	0	0	0	0	Sunk	12 December 1944	Sunk then raised & re-entered service. Collision with German minesweeper
U-417	1942	VIIC		0	0	0	0	0	0	0	0	0	0	Sunk	11 June 1943	RAF Fortress
U-418	1942	VIIC		0	0	0	0	0	0	0	0	0	0	Sunk	30 May 1943	RAF Catalina
U-419	1942	VIIC		0	0	0	0	0	0	0	0	0	0	Sunk	8 October 1943	RAF Liberator
U-420	1942	VIIC		0	0	0	0	0	0	0	0	0	0	Missing	20 October 1943	
U-421	1942	VIIC		0	0	0	0	0	0	0	0	0	0	Sunk	29 April 1944	US aircraft
U-422	1942	VIIC		0	0	0	0	0	0	0	0	0	0	Sunk	4 October 1943	USN aircraft
U-423	1942	VIIC		0	0	0	0	0	0	0	0	0	0	Sunk	17 June 1944	Norwegian Catalina
U-424	1942	VIIC		0	0	0	0	0	0	0	0	0	0	Sunk	11 February 1944	HMS Woodpecker & HMS Wild Goose
U-425	1942	VIIC		0	0	0	0	0	0	0	0	0	0	Sunk	17 February 1945	HMS Lark and HMS Alnwick Castle
U-426	1943	VIIC		0	0	0	0	1	6,625	0	0	0	0	Sunk	8 January 1944	RAAF Sunderland
U-427	1943	VIIC		0	0	0	0	0	0	0	0	0	0	Surrendered	9 May 1945	Operation Deadlight
U-428	1943	VIIC		0	0	0	0	0	0	0	0	0	0	Scuttled	5 May 1945	Originally Italian sub S-1
U-429	1943	VIIC		0	0	0	0	0	0	0	0	0	0	Sunk	30 March 1945	US aircraft. Originally Italian sub S-4
U-430	1943	VIIC		0	0	0	0	0	0	0	0	0	0	Sunk	30 March 1945	US aircraft. Originally Italian sub S-6
U-431	1941	VIIC	Wilhelm Dommes, Dietrich Schöneboom	3	3,861	1	450	6	7,679	1	3,560	0	0	Sunk	21 October 1943	RAF Wellington
U-432	1941	VIIC	Heinz-Otto Schultze	1	1,340	0	0	20	67,991	2	15,666	0	0	Sunk	11 March 1943	Free French Aconit
U-433	1941	VIIC		0	0	0	0	0	0	1	2,215	0	0	Sunk	16 November 1941	HMS Marigold
U-434	1941	VIIC	Wolfgang Heyda	0	0	0	0	0	0	0	0	0	0	Sunk	18 December 1941	HMS Blankney and HMS Stanley
U-435	1941	VIIC	Siegfried Strelow	4	3,311	0	0	9	53,712	0	0	0	0	Sunk	9 July 1943	RAF Wellington
U-436	1941	VIIC	Günther Seibicke	1	291	0	0	6	36,208	2	15,575	0	0	Sunk	26 May 1943	HMS Test and HMS Hyderabad
U-437	1941	VIIC		0	0	0	0	0	0	0	0	0	0	Stricken	5 October 1944	Bomb damage
U-438	1941	VIIC		0	0	0	0	3	12,045	1	5,496	0	0	Sunk	6 May 1943	HMS Pelican
U-439	1941	VIIC		0	0	0	0	0	0	0	0	0	0	Sunk	4 May 1943	Collision with U-659
U-440	1941	VIIC	Heinz Sieder	0	0	0	0	0	0	0	0	0	0	Sunk	31 May 1943	RAF Sunderland
U-441	1941	VIIC		0	0	0	0	1	7,051	0	0	0	0	Sunk	30 June 1944	RAF Liberator
U-442	1942	VIIC		0	0	0	0	4	25,417	0	0	0	0	Sunk	12 February 1943	RAF Hudson
U-443	1942	VIIC		1	1,087	0	0	3	19,435	0	0	0	0	Sunk	23 February 1943	HMS Bicester, HMS Lamerton and HMS Wheatland
U-444	1942	VIIC		0	0	0	0	0	0	0	0	0	0	Sunk	11 March 1943	HMS Harvester & Free French Aconit
U-445	1942	VIIC		0	0	0	0	0	0	0	0	0	0	Sunk	24 August 1944	HMS Louis
U-446	1942	VIIC		0	0	0	0	0	0	0	0	0	0	Scuttled	3 May 1945	
U-447	1942	VIIC		0	0	0	0	0	0	0	0	0	0	Sunk	7 May 1943	RAF Hudson
U-448	1942	VIIC		0	0	0	0	0	0	0	0	0	0	Sunk	14 April 1944	HMS Pelican and HMCS Swansea
U-449	1942	VIIC		0	0	0	0	0	0	0	0	0	0	Sunk	24 June 1943	HMS Wren, HMS Woodpecker, HMS Kite and HMS Wild Goose
U-450	1942	VIIC		0	0	0	0	0	0	0	0	0	0	Sunk	10 March 1944	HMS Blankney, HMS Brecon, HMS Exmoor, HMS Blencathra and USS Madison
U-451	1941	VIIC		1	550	0	0	0	0	0	0	0	0	Sunk	21 December 1941	RN Swordfish
U-452	1941	VIIC		0	0	0	0	0	0	0	0	0	0	Sunk	25 August 1941	HMS Vascama & RAF Catalina
U-453	1941	VIIC	Egon-Reiner von Schlippenbach	2	2,540	1	9,716	9	23,289	1	6,894	0	0	Sunk	21 May 1944	HMS Termagant, HMS Tenacious & HMS Liddesdale
U-454	1941	VIIC		1	1,870	0	0	1	557	1	5,395	0	0	Sunk	1 August 1943	RAAF Sunderland
U-455	1941	VIIC		0	0	0	0	3	17,685	0	0	0	0	Sunk	5 April 1944	Struck a mine
U-456	1941	VIIC	Max-Martin Teichert	0	0	1	11,500	6	31,528	1	6,421	0	0	Sunk	12 May 1943	HMS Opportune & RAF Liberator
U-457	1941	VIIC		0	0	0	0	2	15,593	1	8,939	0	0	Sunk	16 September 1942	HMS Impulsive
U-458	1941	VIIC		0	0	0	0	2	7,584	0	0	0	0	Sunk	22 August 1943	HMS Easton and the Greek escort destroyer Pindos
U-459	1941	XIV		0	0	0	0	0	0	0	0	0	0	Sunk	24 July 1943	Milch Cow; RAF Wellington
U-460	1941	XIV		0	0	0	0	0	0	0	0	0	0	Sunk	4 October 1943	USN TBM Avenger & F4F Wildcat aircraft
U-461	1941	XIV		0	0	0	0	0	0	0	0	0	0	Sunk	30 July 1943	Milch Cow; RAAF Sunderland
U-462	1941	XIV		0	0	0	0	0	0	0	0	0	0	Sunk	30 July 1943	RAF Halifax, HMS Wren, HMS Kite, HMS Woodpecker, HMS Wild Goose and HMS Woodcock
U-463	1941	XIV		0	0	0	0	0	0	0	0	0	0	Sunk	16 May 1943	Milch Cow; RAF Halifax
U-464	1941	XIV		0	0	0	0	0	0	0	0	0	0	Sunk	20 August 1942	Milch Cow; US Catalina
U-465	1942	VIIC		0	0	0	0	0	0	0	0	0	0	Sunk	2 May 1943	RAAF Sunderland
U-466	1942	VIIC	Gerhard Thäter	0	0	0	0	0	0	0	0	0	0	Scuttled	19 August 1944	
U-467	1942	VIIC		0	0	0	0	0	0	0	0	0	0	Sunk	25 May 1943	US Catalina
U-468	1942	VIIC		0	0	0	0	1	6,537	0	0	0	0	Sunk	11 August 1943	RAF Liberator, Lloyd Allan Trigg VC
U-469	1942	VIIC		0	0	0	0	0	0	0	0	0	0	Sunk	25 March 1943	RAF Fortress
U-470	1942	VIIC		0	0	0	0	0	0	0	0	0	0	Sunk	16 October 1943	RAF Liberator
U-471	1943	VIIC		0	0	0	0	0	0	0	0	0	0	Sunk	6 August 1944	US Liberator
U-472	1943	VIIC		0	0	0	0	0	0	0	0	0	0	Sunk	4 March 1944	HMS Onslaught, HMS Chaser and Fairey Swordfish
U-473	1943	VIIC		1	1,400	0	0	0	0	0	0	0	0	Sunk	6 May 1944	HMS Starling, HMS Wren and HMS Wild Goose
U-475	1943	VIIC		0	0	1	56	0	0	0	0	0	0	Scuttled	3 May 1945	
U-476	1943	VIIC		0	0	0	0	0	0	0	0	0	0	Scuttled	25 May 1944	
U-477	1943	VIIC		0	0	0	0	0	0	0	0	0	0	Sunk	3 June 1944	RCAF Canso
U-478	1943	VIIC		0	0	0	0	0	0	0	0	0	0	Sunk	30 June 1944	RCAF Canso & RAF Liberator
U-479	1943	VIIC	Hans-Joachim Förster	0	0	1	56	0	0	0	0	0	0	Sunk	27 November 1944	
U-480	1943	VIIC	Hans-Joachim Förster	2	1,775	0	0	2	12,846	0	0	0	0	Sunk	29 January 1945	Struck a mine
U-481	1943	VIIC		3	160	1	26	4	1,165	0	0	0	0	Surrendered	9 May 1945	Operation Deadlight
U-482	1943	VIIC		1	1,010	0	0	4	31,611	0	0	0	0	Sunk	25 November 1944	HMS Ascension
U-483	1943	VIIC		1	1,300	0	0	0	0	0	0	0	0	Surrendered	9 May 1945	Operation Deadlight
U-484	1943	VIIC		0	0	0	0	0	0	0	0	0	0	Sunk	9 September 1944	HMS Portchester Castle and HMS Helmsdale
U-485	1944	VIIC		0	0	0	0	0	0	0	0	0	0	Surrendered	12 May 1945	
U-486	1944	VIIC		2	2,170	0	0	2	17,651	0	0	0	0	Sunk	12 April 1945	HMS Tapir
U-487	1942	XIV		0	0	0	0	0	0	0	0	0	0	Sunk	13 July 1943	Milch Cow; USN aircraft
U-488	1942	XIV		0	0	0	0	0	0	0	0	0	0	Sunk	26 April 1944	USS Frost, Huse, Barber and Snowden
U-489	1942	XIV		0	0	0	0	0	0	0	0	0	0	Sunk	4 August 1943	Milch Cow; RCAF Sunderland
U-490	1942	XIV		0	0	0	0	0	0	0	0	0	0	Sunk	12 June 1944	USS Croatan, Frost, Huse and Inch
U-501	1941	IXC		0	0	0	0	1	2,000	0	0	0	0	Sunk	10 September 1941	HMCS Chambly and HMCS Moose Jaw
U-502	1941	IXC	Jürgen von Rosenstiel	0	0	0	0	14	78,843	2	23,797	0	0	Sunk	6 July 1942	RAF Wellington
U-503	1941	IXC		0	0	0	0	0	0	0	0	0	0	Sunk	15 March 1942	US Hudson
U-504	1941	IXC	Fritz Poske	0	0	0	0	15	78,123	0	0	1	7,176	Sunk	30 July 1943	HMS Kite, HMS Woodpecker, HMS Wren and HMS Wild Goose
U-505	1941	IXC	Peter Zschech	0	0	0	0	8	45,005	0	0	0	0	Captured	4 June 1944	US Navy; museum ship
U-506	1941	IXC	Erich Würdemann	0	0	0	0	14	69,893	3	23,358	1	6,821	Sunk	12 July 1943	US Liberator
U-507	1941	IXC	Harro Schacht	0	0	0	0	19	77,143	1	6,561	0	0	Sunk	13 January 1943	US Catalina
U-508	1941	IXC	Georg Staats	0	0	0	0	14	74,087	0	0	0	0	Sunk	12 November 1943	US Liberator
U-509	1941	IXC		0	0	0	0	5	29,091	3	20,014	1	7,129	Sunk	15 July 1943	USN Avenger aircraft
U-510	1941	IXC	Karl Neitzel, Alfred Eick	1	249	0	0	11	71,100	8	53,289	3	24,338	Captured	10 May 1945	Became French submarine Bouan
U-511	1941	IXC		0	0	0	0	5	41,373	1	8,773	0	0	Sold	16 September 1943	Became Japanese sub RO 500
U-512	1941	IXC		0	0	0	0	3	20,619	0	0	0	0	Sunk	2 October 1942	US Douglas B-18 Bolo aircraft. Franz Machon
U-513	1941	IXC	Friedrich Guggenberger	0	0	0	0	6	29,940	2	13,177	0	0	Sunk	19 July 1943	US Navy Mariner aircraft
U-514	1941	IXC		0	0	0	0	4	16,329	2	13,551	2	8,202	Sunk	8 July 1943	RAF Liberator
U-515	1941	IXC	Werner Henke	2	12,200	1	1,920	22	140,196	1	6,034	1	4,668	Sunk	9 April 1944	US Avenger, Wildcat aircraft, USS Pope, Pillsbury, Chatelain and Flaherty
U-516	1941	IXC	Herbert Kuppisch	0	0	0	0	16	89,385	1	9,687	0	0	Surrendered	14 May 1945	Operation Deadlight
U-517	1941	IXC		1	900	0	0	8	26,383	0	0	0	0	Sunk	21 November 1942	RAF Fairey Albacore
U-518	1942	IXC		0	0	0	0	9	55,747	3	22,616	0	0	Sunk	22 April 1945	USS Carter and USS Neal A. Scott
U-519	1942	IXC		0	0	0	0	0	0	0	0	0	0	Missing	31 January 1943	
U-520	1942	IXC		0	0	0	0	0	0	0	0	0	0	Sunk	30 October 1942	RCAF Douglas Digby
U-521	1942	IXC	Klaus Bargsten	1	750	0	0	3	19,551	0	0	0	0	Sunk	2 June 1943	USS Gilmer
U-522	1942	IXC	Herbert Schneider	0	0	0	0	7	45,826	2	12,479	0	0	Sunk	23 February 1943	HMS Totland
U-523	1942	IXC		0	0	0	0	1	5,848	0	0	0	0	Sunk	25 August 1943	HMS Wanderer and HMS Wallflower
U-524	1942	IXC		0	0	0	0	2	16,256	0	0	0	0	Sunk	22 March 1943	US Liberator
U-525	1942	IXC/40		0	0	0	0	1	3,454	0	0	0	0	Sunk	11 August 1943	USN TBM Avenger & F4F Wildcat aircraft
U-526	1942	IXC/40		0	0	0	0	0	0	0	0	0	0	Sunk	14 April 1943	Struck a mine
U-527	1942	IXC/40		1	291	0	0	1	5,242	1	5,848	0	0	Sunk	23 July 1943	USN aircraft
U-528	1942	IXC/40		0	0	0	0	0	0	0	0	0	0	Sunk	11 May 1943	RAF Halifax & HMS Fleetwood
U-529	1942	IXC/40		0	0	0	0	0	0	0	0	0	0	Sunk	15 February 1943	RAF Liberator
U-530	1942	IXC/40		0	0	0	0	2	12,063	1	10,195	0	0	Surrendered	10 July 1945	USS Toro
U-531	1942	IXC/40		0	0	0	0	0	0	0	0	0	0	Sunk	6 May 1943	HMS Vidette
U-532	1942	IXC/40		0	0	0	0	8	46,895	2	13,128	0	0	Surrendered	13 May 1945	Operation Deadlight
U-533	1942	IXC/40		0	0	0	0	0	0	0	0	0	0	Sunk	16 October 1943	RAF Bristol Blenheim
U-534	1942	IXC/40		0	0	0	0	0	0	0	0	0	0	Sunk	5 May 1945	Museum ship, Birkenhead
U-535	1942	IXC/40		0	0	0	0	0	0	0	0	0	0	Sunk	5 July 1943	RAF Liberator
U-536	1942	IXC/40		0	0	0	0	0	0	0	0	0	0	Sunk	20 November 1943	HMS Nene, HMCS Snowberry and HMCS Calgary
U-537	1942	IXC/40		0	0	0	0	0	0	0	0	0	0	Sunk	10 November 1944	USS Flounder
U-538	1942	IXC/40		0	0	0	0	0	0	0	0	0	0	Sunk	21 November 1943	HMS Foley and HMS Crane
U-539	1942	IXC/40		0	0	0	0	1	1,517	2	12,896	0	0	Surrendered	9 May 1945	Operation Deadlight
U-540	1942	IXC/40		0	0	0	0	0	0	0	0	0	0	Sunk	17 October 1943	RAF Liberator
U-541	1943	IXC/40		0	0	0	0	1	2,140	0	0	0	0	Surrendered	12 May 1945	Operation Deadlight
U-542	1943	IXC/40		0	0	0	0	0	0	0	0	0	0	Sunk	28 November 1943	RAF Wellington
U-543	1943	IXC/40	Hans-Jürgen Hellriegel	0	0	0	0	0	0	0	0	0	0	Sunk	2 July 1944	USN Grumman Avenger
U-544	1943	IXC/40		0	0	0	0	0	0	0	0	0	0	Sunk	16 January 1944	US aircraft
U-545	1943	IXC/40		0	0	0	0	0	0	1	7,359	0	0	Scuttled	10 February 1944	Bomb damage
U-546	1943	IXC/40		1	1,200	0	0	0	0	0	0	0	0	Sunk	24 April 1945	USS Flaherty, USS Varian, USS Neunzer, USS Hubbard, USS Keith, USS Chatelain, USS Janssen, and USS Pillsbury
U-547	1943	IXC/40		1	750	0	0	2	8,371	0	0	0	0	Scuttled	31 December 1944	Damaged & out of service
U-548	1943	IXC/40		1	1,445	0	0	0	0	0	0	0	0	Sunk	19 April 1945	Reuben James and Buckley
U-549	1943	IXC/40		1	9,393	1	1,300	0	0	0	0	0	0	Sunk	29 May 1944	USS Eugene E. Elmore and USS Ahrens
U-550	1943	IXC/40		0	0	0	0	1	11,017	0	0	0	0	Sunk	16 April 1944	USS Joyce, USS Peterson and USS Gandy
U-551	1940	VIIC		0	0	0	0	0	0	0	0	0	0	Sunk	23 March 1941	Depth charged by RN trawler
U-552	1940	VIIC	Erich Topp, Siegfried Koitschka	2	1,710	0	0	30	163,756	3	26,910	0	0	Scuttled	5 May 1945	
U-553	1940	VIIC	Karl Thurmann	1	925	0	0	12	61,390	2	15,273	0	0	Missing	20 January 1943	Mechanical failure
U-554	1940	VIIC		0	0	0	0	0	0	0	0	0	0	Scuttled	5 May 1945	Training boat
U-555	1940	VIIC		0	0	0	0	0	0	0	0	0	0	Surrendered	3 May 1945	Operation Deadlight
U-556	1940	VIIC	Herbert Wohlfarth	0	0	0	0	6	29,552	1	4,986	0	0	Sunk	27 June 1941	HMS Nasturtium, HMS Celandine and HMS Gladiolus
U-557	1940	VIIC	Gerd Kelbling, Herbert Werner	1	5,220	0	0	6	31,729	0	0	0	0	Sunk	16 December 1941	Accidentally rammed & sunk by Italian torpedo boat
U-558	1940	VIIC	Günther Krech	1	913	0	0	17	93,186	2	15,070	1	6,672	Sunk	20 July 1943	RAF Halifax
U-559	1941	VIIC	Hans Heidtmann	1	1,060	0	0	4	11,811	0	0	2	6,117	Sunk	30 October 1942	HMS Pakenham, HMS Petard, HMS Hero, HMS Dulverton, HMS Hurworth and RAF Sunderland
U-560	1941	VIIC		0	0	0	0	0	0	0	0	0	0	Scuttled	3 May 1945	Training boat
U-561	1941	VIIC	Robert Bartels	0	0	0	0	5	17,146	1	4,043	1	5,062	Sunk	12 July 1943	RN MTB-81
U-562	1941	VIIC	Horst Hamm	0	0	0	0	6	37,287	1	3,359	0	0	Sunk	19 February 1943	HMS Isis, HMS Hursley & Wellington bomber
U-563	1941	VIIC	Klaus Bargsten	1	1,870	0	0	3	14,689	2	16,266	0	0	Sunk	31 May 1943	RAF & RAAF Halifax & Sunderland aircraft
U-564	1941	VIIC	Reinhard Suhren	1	900	0	0	18	95,544	4	28,907	0	0	Sunk	14 June 1943	RAF Whitley depth charges
U-565	1941	VIIC	Wilhelm Franken	2	6,990	0	0	3	11,347	2	17,565	0	0	Scuttled	30 September 1944	Bomb damage
U-566	1941	VIIC		1	2,265	0	0	6	38,092	0	0	0	0	Scuttled	24 October 1943	Bomb damage
U-567	1941	VIIC	Engelbert Endrass	0	0	0	0	2	6,809	0	0	0	0	Sunk	21 December 1941	HMS Deptford and Samphire
U-568	1941	VIIC		2	1,850	1	1,630	1	6,023	0	0	0	0	Sunk	28 May 1942	HMS Hero, HMS Eridge and HMS Hurworth
U-569	1941	VIIC		0	0	0	0	1	984	1	4,458	0	0	Scuttled	22 May 1943	Bomb damage
U-570	1941	VIIC		0	0	0	0	0	0	0	0	0	0	Captured	27 August 1941	Renamed HMS Graph
U-571	1941	VIIC	Helmut Möhlmann	1	3,870	0	0	5	33,511	1	11,394	1	9,788	Sunk	28 January 1944	RAAF Sunderland
U-572	1941	VIIC		0	0	0	0	6	19,323	1	6,207	0	0	Sunk	3 August 1943	US Mariner
U-573	1941	VIIC		0	0	0	0	1	5,289	0	0	0	0	Interned, then sold	2 August 1942	Became Spanish sub G-7
U-574	1941	VIIC		1	1,190	0	0	0	0	0	0	0	0	Sunk	19 December 1941	HMS Stork
U-575	1941	VIIC	Günther Heydemann	1	1,015	0	0	8	36,010	1	12,910	0	0	Sunk	13 March 1944	HMCS Prince Rupert, USS Hobson, USS Haverfield and RAF Wellington, Fortress and Grumman Avenger aircraft
U-576	1941	VIIC		0	0	0	0	4	15,450	2	19,457	0	0	Sunk	15 July 1942	US Kingfisher aircraft
U-577	1941	VIIC		0	0	0	0	0	0	0	0	0	0	Sunk	15 January 1942	RN Swordfish
U-578	1941	VIIC		1	1,090	0	0	4	23,635	0	0	0	0	Missing	6 August 1942	Unknown
U-579	1941	VIIC		0	0	0	0	0	0	0	0	0	0	Sunk	5 May 1945	RAF Liberator
U-580	1941	VIIC		0	0	0	0	0	0	0	0	0	0	Sunk	11 November 1941	Collision accident
U-581	1941	VIIC		1	364	0	0	0	0	0	0	0	0	Sunk	2 February 1942	HMS Westcott
U-582	1941	VIIC		1	46	0	0	6	38,826	0	0	0	0	Sunk	5 October 1942	US Catalina
U-583	1941	VIIC		0	0	0	0	0	0	0	0	0	0	Sunk	15 November 1941	Collision accident
U-584	1941	VIIC		1	206	0	0	3	18,478	0	0	0	0	Sunk	31 October 1943	US Grumman Avenger aircraft
U-585	1941	VIIC		0	0	0	0	0	0	0	0	0	0	Sunk	30 March 1942	Struck a German mine
U-586	1941	VIIC		0	0	0	0	2	12,716	1	9,057	0	0	Sunk	5 July 1944	US Liberator
U-587	1941	VIIC		1	655	0	0	4	22,734	0	0	0	0	Sunk	27 March 1942	HMS Grove, HMS Aldenham, HMS Volunteer and HMS Leamington
U-588	1941	VIIC		0	0	0	0	7	31,492	2	13,131	0	0	Sunk	31 July 1942	HMCS Wetaskiwin and HMCS Skeena
U-589	1941	VIIC		1	417	0	0	0	0	1	2,847	0	0	Sunk	14 September 1942	HMS Onslow and Fairey Swordfish
U-590	1941	VIIC		0	0	0	0	1	5,228	1	5,464	0	0	Sunk	9 July 1943	US Catalina
U-591	1941	VIIC		0	0	0	0	4	19,932	1	5,701	0	0	Sunk	30 July 1943	US Lockheed Ventura
U-592	1941	VIIC		0	0	0	0	1	3,770	0	0	0	0	Sunk	31 January 1944	HMS Starling, HMS Wild Goose and HMS Magpie
U-593	1941	VIIC	Gerd Kelbling	5	4,579	2	1,677	9	38,290	1	4,853	1	8,426	Sunk	13 December 1943	USS Wainwright & HMS Calpe
U-594	1941	VIIC		0	0	0	0	2	14,390	0	0	0	0	Sunk	5 June 1943	RAF Hudson
U-595	1941	VIIC		0	0	0	0	0	0	0	0	0	0	Sunk	14 November 1942	RAF Hudson
U-596	1941	VIIC	Gunter Jahn	1	246	0	0	12	41,411	2	14,180	0	0	Scuttled	30 September 1944	Bomb damage
U-597	1941	VIIC		0	0	0	0	0	0	0	0	0	0	Sunk	12 October 1942	RAF Liberator
U-598	1941	VIIC		0	0	0	0	2	9,295	1	6,197	0	0	Sunk	23 July 1943	US Liberator
U-599	1941	VIIC		0	0	0	0	0	0	0	0	0	0	Sunk	24 October 1942	RAF Liberator
