= List of German U-boats in World War II =

- List of German U-boats in World War II (1-599)
- List of German U-boats in World War II (600-4712)
