= Wolfpack Brandenburg =

Wolf pack Brandenburg
- Active: 15 September 1941 – 2 October 1941
- Country: Nazi Germany
- Branch: Kriegsmarine
- Size: 11 submarines

Commanders
- Notable commanders: Wilhelm Dommes; Günther Heydemann; Otto Ites; Eitel-Friedrich Kentrat; Reinhard Suhren; Erich Topp

Brandenburg was the name given to a wolfpack of German U-boats that operated during the World War II Battle of the Atlantic in 1941 from 15 September 1941 to 2 October 1941

== Brandenburg ==
The group was responsible for sinking 10 merchant ships (54,593 gross register tons (GRT)) and 1 warship (925 tons).

=== Raiding history ===
Date	U-boat	Name of ship	Nationality	Tons	Convoy	Fate
15 September 1941	U-94	Empire Eland	United Kingdom	5,613	ON 14	Sunk
15 September 1941	U-94	Newbury	United Kingdom	5,102	ON 14	Sunk
15 September 1941	U-94	Pegasus	Greece	5,762	ON 14	Sunk
19 September 1941	U-372	Baron Pentland	United Kingdom	3,410	SC 42	Sunk
19 September 1941	U-74	HMCS Lévis	Royal Canadian Navy	925	SC 44	Sunk
20 September 1941	U-552	Barbro	Norway	6,325	SC 44	Sunk
20 September 1941	U-74	Empire Burton	United Kingdom	6,966	SC 44	Sunk
20 September 1941	U-552	Pink Star	Panama	4,150	SC 44	Sunk
20 September 1941	U-552	T. J. Williams	United Kingdom	8,212	SC 44	Sunk
22 September 1941	U-562	Erna III	United Kingdom	1,590	ON 16	Sunk
2 October 1941	U-562	Empire Wave	United Kingdom	7,463	ON 19	Sunk

=== U-boats ===
U-boat	Commander	From	To
U-69	Wilhelm Zahn	15 September 1941	24 September 1941
U-74	Eitel-Friedrich Kentrat	15 September 1941	20 September 1941
U-94	Otto Ites	15 September 1941	29 September 1941
U-372	Heinz-Joachim Neumann	15 September 1941	1 October 1941
U-373	Paul-Karl Loeser	15 September 1941	24 September 1941
U-431	Wilhelm Dommes	15 September 1941	1 October 1941
U-552	Erich Topp	15 September 1941	26 September 1941
U-562	Horst Hamm	15 September 1941	2 October 1941
U-564	Reinhard Suhren	16 September 1941	19 September 1941
U-572	Heinz Hirsacker	15 September 1941	1 October 1941
U-575	Günther Heydemann	15 September 1941	26 September 1941

== Bibliography ==
- Edwards, Bernard (1996). Dönitz and the Wolf Packs - The U-boats at War. Cassell Military Classics. pp. 117, 119, 123–125. ISBN 0-304-35203-9.
