= German submarine U-429 =

German World War II submarine

History

Nazi Germany
- Name: U-429
- Ordered: 25 August 1941
- Builder: Danziger Werft, Danzig
- Yard number: 130
- Laid down: 14 September 1942
- Launched: 30 March 1943
- Commissioned: 14 July 1943
- Fate: Destroyed by bombing on 30 March 1945

General characteristics
- Class & type: Type VIIC submarine
- Displacement: 769 tonnes (757 long tons) surfaced; 871 t (857 long tons) submerged
- Length: 67.10 m (220 ft 2 in) o/a; 50.50 m (165 ft 8 in) pressure hull
- Beam: 6.20 m (20 ft 4 in) o/a; 4.70 m (15 ft 5 in) pressure hull
- Height: 9.60 m (31 ft 6 in)
- Draught: 4.74 m (15 ft 7 in)
- Installed power: 2,800–3,200 PS (2,100–2,400 kW; 2,800–3,200 bhp) (diesels); 750 PS (550 kW; 740 shp) (electric)
- Propulsion: 2 shafts; 2 × diesel engines; 2 × electric motors
- Speed: 17.7 knots (32.8 km/h; 20.4 mph) surfaced; 7.6 knots (14.1 km/h; 8.7 mph) submerged
- Range: 8,500 nmi (15,700 km; 9,800 mi) at 10 knots (19 km/h; 12 mph) surfaced; 80 nmi (150 km; 92 mi) at 4 knots (7.4 km/h; 4.6 mph) submerged
- Test depth: 230 m (750 ft); Crush depth: 250–295 m (820–968 ft)
- Complement: 4 officers, 40–56 enlisted
- Armament: 5 × 53.3 cm (21 in) torpedo tubes (4 bow, 1 stern); 14 × torpedoes; 1 × 8.8 cm (3.46 in) deck gun (220 rounds); 2 × twin 2 cm (0.79 in) C/30 anti-aircraft guns

Service record
- Part of: 8th U-boat Flotilla; 14 July – 8 September 1943; 23rd U-boat Flotilla; 27 October 1943 – 28 February 1945; 31st U-boat Flotilla; 1 – 30 March 1945
- Identification codes: M 55 421
- Commanders: T.V. Angelo Amendolia; 14 July – 8 September 1943; Oblt.z.S. Ernst-August Racky; 27 October 1943 – 15 October 1944; Oblt.z.S. Martin Kuttkat; 16 October 1944 – 30 March 1945
- Operations: None
- Victories: None

German submarine U-429 was a Type VIIC U-boat of Nazi Germany's Kriegsmarine originally built for the Italian Regia Marina during World War II. Her keel was laid down on 14 September 1942 by Danziger Werft of Danzig. She was then commissioned as S-4 on 14 July 1943 under the command of Tenente di vascello Angelo Amendolia.

Following the Italian armistice on 8 September 1943, the Kriegsmarine took possession of the U-429, which was still in German waters, along with the U-428 and U-430. These boats were not deemed advanced or useful enough for full war service, and on 27 October 1943 they were turned over to training flotillas for service in the Baltic Sea, training up submarine crews for dispatch to operating boats, mainly based in France. After a very uneventful service life, the U-429 was caught in an open dock during a U.S. Eighth Air Force raid on the city of Wilhelmshaven on 30 March 1945, and destroyed by bombing, although her crew were not on board at the time of the attack.

== Design ==
German Type VIIC submarines were preceded by the shorter Type VIIB submarines. U-429 had a displacement of 769 tonnes (757 long tons) when at the surface and 871 tonnes (857 long tons) while submerged. She had a total length of 67.10 m (220 ft 2 in), a pressure hull length of 50.50 m (165 ft 8 in), a beam of 6.20 m (20 ft 4 in), a height of 9.60 m (31 ft 6 in), and a draught of 4.74 m (15 ft 7 in). The submarine was powered by two Germaniawerft F46 four-stroke, six-cylinder supercharged diesel engines producing a total of 2,800 to 3,200 metric horsepower (2,060 to 2,350 kW; 2,760 to 3,160 shp) for use while surfaced, two Siemens-Schuckert GU 343/38–8 double-acting electric motors producing a total of 750 metric horsepower (550 kW; 740 shp) for use while submerged. She had two shafts and two 1.23 m (4 ft) propellers. The boat was capable of operating at depths of up to 230 metres (750 ft).

The submarine had a maximum surface speed of 17.7 knots (32.8 km/h; 20.4 mph) and a maximum submerged speed of 7.6 knots (14.1 km/h; 8.7 mph). When submerged, the boat could operate for 80 nautical miles (150 km; 92 mi) at 4 knots (7.4 km/h; 4.6 mph); when surfaced, she could travel 8,500 nautical miles (15,700 km; 9,800 mi) at 10 knots (19 km/h; 12 mph). U-429 was fitted with five 53.3 cm (21 in) torpedo tubes (four fitted at the bow and one at the stern), fourteen torpedoes, one 8.8 cm (3.46 in) SK C/35 naval gun, 220 rounds, and two twin 2 cm (0.79 in) C/30 anti-aircraft guns. The boat had a complement of between forty-four and sixty.

== Modern dramatization ==
The 2003 film In Enemy Hands features a fictional U-429, which captures the crew of a fictional version of USS Swordfish.

== Bibliography ==
- Busch, Rainer; Röll, Hans-Joachim (1999). German U-boat commanders of World War II : a biographical dictionary. Translated by Brooks, Geoffrey. London, Annapolis, Md: Greenhill Books, Naval Institute Press. ISBN 1-55750-186-6.
- Busch, Rainer; Röll, Hans-Joachim (1999). Deutsche U-Boot-Verluste von September 1939 bis Mai 1945 [German U-boat losses from September 1939 to May 1945]. Der U-Boot-Krieg (in German). Vol. IV. Hamburg, Berlin, Bonn: Mittler. ISBN 3-8132-0514-2.
- Gröner, Erich; Jung, Dieter; Maass, Martin (1991). U-boats and Mine Warfare Vessels. German Warships 1815–1945. Vol. 2. Translated by Thomas, Keith; Magowan, Rachel. London: Conway Maritime Press. ISBN 0-85177-593-4.
- Sharpe, Peter (1998). U-Boat Fact File. Great Britain: Midland Publishing. ISBN 1-85780-072-9.
