= German submarine U-328 =

German World War II submarine

History

Nazi Germany
- Name: U-328
- Ordered: 16 July 1942
- Builder: Flender Werke, Lübeck
- Yard number: 328
- Laid down: 15 May 1943
- Launched: 24 June 1944
- Commissioned: 19 September 1944
- Fate: Surrendered on 9 May 1945; sunk as part of Operation Deadlight on 30 November 1945

General characteristics
- Class & type: Type VIIC/41 submarine
- Displacement: 759 tonnes (747 long tons) surfaced; 860 t (846 long tons) submerged
- Length: 67.23 m (220 ft 7 in) o/a; 50.50 m (165 ft 8 in) pressure hull
- Beam: 6.20 m (20 ft 4 in) o/a; 4.70 m (15 ft 5 in) pressure hull
- Height: 9.60 m (31 ft 6 in)
- Draught: 4.74 m (15 ft 7 in)
- Installed power: 2,800–3,200 PS (2,100–2,400 kW; 2,800–3,200 bhp) (diesels); 750 PS (550 kW; 740 shp) (electric)
- Propulsion: 2 shafts; 2 × diesel engines; 2 × electric motors
- Speed: 17.7 knots (32.8 km/h; 20.4 mph) surfaced; 7.6 knots (14.1 km/h; 8.7 mph) submerged
- Range: 8,500 nmi (15,700 km; 9,800 mi) at 10 knots (19 km/h; 12 mph) surfaced; 80 nmi (150 km; 92 mi) at 4 knots (7.4 km/h; 4.6 mph) submerged
- Test depth: 250 m (820 ft); Crush depth: 275–325 m (902–1,066 ft)
- Complement: 4 officers, 40–56 enlisted
- Armament: 5 × 53.3 cm (21 in) torpedo tubes (four bow, one stern); 14 × torpedoes; 1 × 8.8 cm (3.46 in) deck gun (220 rounds); 1 × 3.7 cm (1.5 in) Flak M42 AA gun; 2 × 2 cm (0.79 in) C/30 AA guns

Service record
- Part of: 4th U-boat Flotilla; 19 September 1944 – 1 May 1945; 11th U-boat Flotilla; 2 – 8 May 1945
- Identification codes: M 43 571
- Commanders: Oblt.z.S. Peter Lawrence; 19 September – 30 November 1944; Oblt.z.S. Hans-Ulrich Scholle; 1 December 1944 – 9 May 1945
- Operations: None
- Victories: None

German submarine U-328 was a Type VIIC/41 U-boat of Nazi Germany's Kriegsmarine during World War II.

She carried out no patrols and sank or damaged no ships.

The boat surrendered in Norway on 9 May 1945 and was sunk as part of Operation Deadlight on 30 November 1945.

== Design ==
Like all Type VIIC/41 U-boats, U-328 had a displacement of 759 tonnes (747 long tons) when at the surface and 860 tonnes (850 long tons) while submerged. She had a total length of 67.10 m (220 ft 2 in), a pressure hull length of 50.50 m (165 ft 8 in), a beam of 6.20 m (20 ft 4 in), and a draught of 4.74 m (15 ft 7 in). The submarine was powered by two Germaniawerft F46 supercharged six-cylinder four-stroke diesel engines producing a total of 2,800 to 3,200 metric horsepower (2,060 to 2,350 kW; 2,760 to 3,160 shp) and two Garbe, Lahmeyer & Co. RP 137/c double-acting electric motors producing a total of 750 metric horsepower (550 kW; 740 shp) for use while submerged. The boat was capable of operating at a depth of 250 metres (820 ft).

The submarine had a maximum surface speed of 17.7 knots (32.8 km/h; 20.4 mph) and a submerged speed of 7.6 knots (14.1 km/h; 8.7 mph). When submerged, the boat could operate for 80 nautical miles (150 km; 92 mi) at 4 knots (7.4 km/h; 4.6 mph); when surfaced, she could travel 8,500 nautical miles (15,700 km; 9,800 mi) at 10 knots (19 km/h; 12 mph). U-328 was fitted with five 53.3 cm (21 in) torpedo tubes (four fitted at the bow and one at the stern), fourteen torpedoes, one 8.8 cm (3.46 in) SK C/35 naval gun, (220 rounds), one 3.7 cm (1.5 in) Flak M42 and two 2 cm (0.79 in) C/30 anti-aircraft guns. Its complement was between forty-four and sixty.

== Service history ==
The submarine was laid down on 15 May 1943 by the Flender Werke yard at Lübeck as yard number 328, launched on 24 June 1944 and commissioned on 19 September under the command of Oberleutnant zur See Peter Lawrence.

She served with the 4th U-boat Flotilla for training, from 19 September 1944 to 1 May 1945 and the 11th flotilla 2 – 8 May 1945. The boat surrendered at Bergen in Norway on 9 May 1945. She was transferred to Loch Ryan in Scotland on the 30th for Operation Deadlight. She was sunk by aircraft of the Fleet Air Arm on 30 November.

== See also ==
- Battle of the Atlantic (1939-1945)

== Bibliography ==
- Busch, Rainer; Röll, Hans-Joachim (1999). German U-boat commanders of World War II : a biographical dictionary. Translated by Brooks, Geoffrey. London, Annapolis, Md: Greenhill Books, Naval Institute Press. ISBN 1-55750-186-6.
- Busch, Rainer; Röll, Hans-Joachim (1999). Deutsche U-Boot-Verluste von September 1939 bis Mai 1945 [German U-boat losses from September 1939 to May 1945]. Der U-Boot-Krieg (in German). Vol. IV. Hamburg; Berlin; Bonn: Mittler. ISBN 3-8132-0514-2.
- Gröner, Erich; Jung, Dieter; Maass, Martin (1991). German Warships 1815–1945, U-boats and Mine Warfare Vessels. Vol. 2. Translated by Thomas, Keith; Magowan, Rachel. London: Conway Maritime Press. ISBN 0-85177-593-4.
