= German submarine U-562 =

German World War II submarine

History

Nazi Germany
- Name: U-562
- Ordered: 16 October 1939
- Builder: Blohm & Voss, Hamburg
- Yard number: 538
- Laid down: 7 February 1940
- Launched: 24 January 1941
- Commissioned: 20 March 1941
- Fate: Sunk on 19 February 1943

General characteristics
- Class & type: Type VIIC submarine
- Displacement: 769 tonnes (757 long tons) surfaced; 871 t (857 long tons) submerged
- Length: 67.10 m (220 ft 2 in) o/a; 50.50 m (165 ft 8 in) pressure hull
- Beam: 6.20 m (20 ft 4 in) o/a; 4.70 m (15 ft 5 in) pressure hull
- Height: 9.60 m (31 ft 6 in)
- Draught: 4.74 m (15 ft 7 in)
- Installed power: 2,800–3,200 PS (2,100–2,400 kW; 2,800–3,200 bhp) (diesels); 750 PS (550 kW; 740 shp) (electric)
- Propulsion: 2 shafts; 2 × diesel engines; 2 × electric motors
- Speed: 17.7 knots (32.8 km/h; 20.4 mph) surfaced; 7.6 knots (14.1 km/h; 8.7 mph) submerged
- Range: 8,500 nmi (15,700 km; 9,800 mi) at 10 knots (19 km/h; 12 mph) surfaced; 80 nmi (150 km; 92 mi) at 4 knots (7.4 km/h; 4.6 mph) submerged
- Test depth: 230 m (750 ft); Crush depth: 250–295 m (820–968 ft)
- Complement: 4 officers, 40–56 enlisted
- Armament: 5 × 53.3 cm (21 in) torpedo tubes (four bow, one stern); 14 × torpedoes or 26 TMA mines; 1 × 8.8 cm (3.46 in) deck gun (220 rounds); 1 x 2 cm (0.79 in) C/30 AA gun

Service record
- Part of: 1st U-boat Flotilla; 20 March – 31 December 1941; 29th U-boat Flotilla; 1 January 1942 – 19 February 1943
- Identification codes: M 40 608
- Commanders: Oblt.z.S. Herwig Collmann; 20 March – 3 September 1941; Kptlt. Horst Hamm; 4 September 1941 – 19 February 1943
- Operations: 10 patrols: 1st patrol: 19 June – 30 July 1941; 2nd patrol: 25 August – 3 September 1941; 3rd patrol: 11 September – 15 October 1941; 4th patrol: 17 November – 6 December 1941; 5th patrol: 6 – 29 December 1941; 6th patrol: 4 April – 11 May 1942; 7th patrol: 22 June – 25 July 1942; 8th patrol: 5 September – 18 October 1942; 9th patrol: 22 November – 24 December 1942; 10th patrol: 7 – 19 February 1943
- Victories: 6 merchant ships sunk (37,287 GRT); 1 merchant ship damaged (3,359 GRT)

German submarine U-562 was a Type VIIC U-boat built for Nazi Germany's Kriegsmarine for service during World War II. She was laid down on 7 February 1940 by Blohm & Voss in Hamburg as yard number 538, launched on 24 January 1941 and commissioned on 20 March 1941 under Oberleutnant zur See Herwig Collmann.

== Design ==
German Type VIIC submarines were preceded by the shorter Type VIIB submarines. U-562 had a displacement of 769 tonnes (757 long tons) when at the surface and 871 tonnes (857 long tons) while submerged. She had a total length of 67.10 m (220 ft 2 in), a pressure hull length of 50.50 m (165 ft 8 in), a beam of 6.20 m (20 ft 4 in), a height of 9.60 m (31 ft 6 in), and a draught of 4.74 m (15 ft 7 in). The submarine was powered by two Germaniawerft F46 four-stroke, six-cylinder supercharged diesel engines producing a total of 2,800 to 3,200 metric horsepower (2,060 to 2,350 kW; 2,760 to 3,160 shp) for use while surfaced, two Brown, Boveri & Cie GG UB 720/8 double-acting electric motors producing a total of 750 metric horsepower (550 kW; 740 shp) for use while submerged. She had two shafts and two 1.23 m (4 ft) propellers. The boat was capable of operating at depths of up to 230 metres (750 ft).

The submarine had a maximum surface speed of 17.7 knots (32.8 km/h; 20.4 mph) and a maximum submerged speed of 7.6 knots (14.1 km/h; 8.7 mph). When submerged, the boat could operate for 80 nautical miles (150 km; 92 mi) at 4 knots (7.4 km/h; 4.6 mph); when surfaced, she could travel 8,500 nautical miles (15,700 km; 9,800 mi) at 10 knots (19 km/h; 12 mph). U-562 was fitted with five 53.3 cm (21 in) torpedo tubes (four fitted at the bow and one at the stern), fourteen torpedoes, one 8.8 cm (3.46 in) SK C/35 naval gun, 220 rounds, and a 2 cm (0.79 in) C/30 anti-aircraft gun. The boat had a complement of between forty-four and sixty.

== Service history ==
The boat's service began on 20 March 1941 with training as part of the 1st U-boat Flotilla. She transferred to the 29th Flotilla on 1 January 1942 for active service, in the Mediterranean.

In ten patrols she sank six merchant ships, for a total of 37,287 gross register tons (GRT), plus one ship damaged.

=== Fate ===
U-562 was sunk on 19 February 1943 in the Mediterranean Sea NE of Bengazi in position 32°57′N 20°54′E, by a RAF Wellington bomber of 38 Squadron together with Royal Navy vessels, the destroyer HMS Isis and destroyer escort HMS Hursley. All 49 hands were lost.

=== Wolfpacks ===
U-562 took part in two wolfpacks, namely:

- Bosemüller (28 August – 2 September 1941)
- Brandenburg (15 September – 2 October 1941)

== Summary of raiding history ==
Date	Ship Name	Nationality	Tonnage (GRT)	Fate
22 September 1941	Erna III	United Kingdom	1,590	Sunk
2 October 1941	Empire Wave	United Kingdom	7,463	Sunk
2 December 1941	Grelhead	United Kingdom	4,274	Sunk
29 April 1942	Alliance	United Kingdom	81	Sunk
29 April 1942	Terpsithea	United Kingdom	157	Sunk
14 July 1942	Adinda	Netherlands	3,359	Damaged
21 December 1942	Strathallan	United Kingdom	23,722	Sunk

== See also ==
- Mediterranean U-boat Campaign (World War II)

== Bibliography ==
- Busch, Rainer; Röll, Hans-Joachim (1999). German U-boat commanders of World War II : a biographical dictionary. Translated by Brooks, Geoffrey. London, Annapolis, Md: Greenhill Books, Naval Institute Press. ISBN 1-55750-186-6.
- Busch, Rainer; Röll, Hans-Joachim (1999). ⌊⌊⌊⌊0⌋⌋⌋⌋ [German U-boat losses from September 1939 to May 1945] (in German). Vol. IV. Hamburg, Berlin, Bonn: Mittler. ISBN 3-8132-0514-2.
- Gröner, Eric; Jung, Dieter; Maass, Martin (1991). ⌊⌊⌊⌊1⌋⌋⌋⌋: U-boats and Mine Warfare Vessels. Vol. 2. Translated by Thomas, Keith; Magowan, Rachel. London: Conway Maritime Press. ISBN 0-85177-593-4.
- Sharpe, Peter (1998). U-Boat Fact File. Great Britain: Midland Publishing. ISBN 1-85780-072-9.
