= Karl-Heinz Marbach =

German Nazi officer in WWII

- Born: 5 July 1917
- Died: 27 September 1995 (aged 78)
- Occupations: Kriegsmarine; West German Navy; Central Intelligence Agency
- Awards: Knight's Cross of the Iron Cross

Karl-Heinz Marbach (5 July 1917 – 27 September 1995) was a German officer who served in the Kriegsmarine, the navy of Nazi Germany, during World War II, and later in the West German Navy. From 1950 to 1959 he was Principal Agent of the U.S. Central Intelligence Agency-funded network with the codename LCCASSOCK, which was one of CIA's Psychological warfare efforts directed against Eastern Germany.

== Awards ==
- Iron Cross (1939) 2nd Class (14 April 1940) & 1st Class (21 November 1943)
- Knight's Cross of the Iron Cross on 22 July 1944 as Oberleutnant zur See and commander of U-953
