= Horst Hamm =

German U-boat commander (1916–1943)

- Born: 17 March 1916; Düsseldorf, German Empire
- Died: 19 February 1943 (aged 26); Mediterranean Sea
- Military career
- Allegiance: Nazi Germany
- Branch: Kriegsmarine
- Service years: 1935–43
- Rank: Kapitänleutnant
- Commands: U-58; U-562
- Conflicts: World War II

Horst Hamm (17 March 1916 – 19 February 1943) was a German U-boat commander in World War II.

== Naval career ==
Horst Hamm joined the Kriegsmarine (German navy) in 1935. From August 1939 to May 1940 he served as the Second Watch Officer (2WO) on the U-26 spending 120 days at sea on four patrols. From June to August 1940 he served with the 1st U-boat Flotilla before being sent as First Watch Officer on the famous U-96 in September. With the U-96 Hamm went out on three patrols spending 70 days at sea. On his first patrol with this boat they sank five ships (37,037 GRT) and damaged two more (15,864). The second patrol was also successful but the third patrol saw the boat sink 7 ships with a total of 45,391 GRT. 190 days at sea during 7 patrols on two U-boats under very competent Commanders gave Hamm invaluable experience for his own command. He got his own boat on 7 April 1941 when he took command of the small school boat U-58 for 5 months. Hamm got his second boat, the larger U-562, on 4 September 1941. Hamm would take his U-562 out on eight patrols, 241 days at sea, from September 1941. During this time he sank six ships with a total of 37,287 GRT and damaged one merchant of 3,359 GRT. On 27 November 1941 U-562 passed the dangerous Straits of Gibraltar into the Mediterranean. The boat thus left the Atlantic for good, having completed one patrol there. Hamm and his entire crew of 49 men died when the U-562 was sunk in the Mediterranean north-east of Benghazi, Libya by depth charges from the British destroyer Isis, the British escort destroyer Hursley and a British Wellington aircraft.

== Ships attacked ==
Date	U-boat	Name of ship	Nationality	Tonnage	Fate
22 September 1941	U-562	Erna III	United Kingdom	1,590	Sunk
2 October 1941	U-562	Empire Wave	United Kingdom	7,463	Sunk
2 December 1941	U-562	Grelhead	United Kingdom	4,274	Sunk
29 April 1942	U-562	Alliance	United Kingdom	81	Sunk
14 July 1942	U-562	Adinda	Netherlands	3,359	Damaged
21 December 1942	U-562	Strathallan	United Kingdom	23,722	Sunk

== See also ==
- List of people who disappeared mysteriously at sea

== Bibliography ==
- Busch, Rainer; Röll, Hans-Joachim (1999). German U-boat commanders of World War II : a biographical dictionary. Translated by Brooks, Geoffrey. London, Annapolis, Md: Greenhill Books, Naval Institute Press. ISBN 1-55750-186-6.
