= Convoy SL 125 =

Convoy during naval battles of the Second World War

Convoy
- Part of World War II
| Date | 16–30 October 1942 |
| Location | North Atlantic |
| Result | German victory |

Belligerents
| Kriegsmarine | Royal Navy; Royal New Zealand Navy; Free French Naval Forces |

Strength
| 12 U-boats | 42 merchant ships |

Casualties and losses
| | 12 merchant ships sunk |

Convoy SL 125 was the 125th of the numbered series of World War II SL convoys of merchant ships from Sierra Leone to Liverpool. Ships carrying commodities bound to the British Isles from South America, Africa, and the Indian Ocean travelled independently to Freetown, Sierra Leone, to be convoyed for the last leg of their voyage. Thirty-seven merchant ships departed Freetown on 16 October 1942 and were joined at sea by five more.

== Initial contact ==
German cryptographers decoded message traffic containing tactical information about convoy SL 125, and wolf pack Streitaxt (battle axe), consisting of U-103, U-134, U-203, U-409, U-440, U-509, U-510, U-572, U-604, and U-659 was assembled 23 October to intercept the convoy west of the Canary Islands. The only United States merchant ship and escorting sloop HMS Bridgewater, Isles-class trawler HMS Copinsay and Free French corvette Commandant Drogou had been detached by the time U-203 found the convoy on 25 October. U-203 was depth charged and damaged while attempting to attack the straggling British tanker Anglo Maersk. The tanker was subsequently shadowed by U-134 and damaged by U-509.

== 27 October ==
The armed merchant cruiser and troopship HMS Esperance Bay was detached with the Shakespearian-class trawler HMS Juliet, tugboat HMS Salvonia, and repair ship HMNZS Kelantan when U-409 found and reported the main convoy of 37 ships on 27 October. Forty-one merchant ships were left in the care of Flower-class corvettes Petunia, Cowslip, Crocus, HMS Dahlia, and Woodruff. U-659 was depth charged and damaged while attempting to attack the convoy. After moonrise, U-604 sank the damaged Anglo Maersk while U-509 torpedoed the British freighters Pacific Star and Stentor.

== 28 October ==
After unsuccessful submerged daylight attacks on 28 October, U-509 sank the British freighter Nagpore and damaged the British freighter Hopecastle after sunset. U-203 sank the damaged Hopecastle before dawn.

== 29 October ==
U-509 sank the British freighter Britanny during foul weather on the night of 29–30 October. The British tanker Bullmouth (sailing in ballast) was damaged by U-409 and sunk by U-659. The British refrigerated cargo ship Corinaldo was damaged by both U-509 and U-659 before being sunk by U-203.

== 30 October ==
Improved weather brought coordinated attacks on the night of 30–31 October. U-409 torpedoed the British freighter Silverwillow while U-604 torpedoed the British transport President Doumer and the British freighter Baron Vernon. The British freighter Tasmania was damaged by U-659 and sunk by U-103. The Norwegian freighter Alaska was damaged by U-510, but reached England safely with the help of newly arriving escorts.

== Aftermath ==
Long-range bombers of RAF Coastal Command arrived over the convoy on 31 October. Admiral Dönitz cancelled operations on the morning of 1 November. The convoy was reinforced with eleven more escorts and reached Liverpool on 9 November. It had suffered the greatest loss of any SL convoy, but its timing focused the available U-boats in the area away from the Operation Torch convoys for the allied invasion of North Africa on 8 November 1942. Some historians have suggested that the trade convoy SL 125 was an intentional tactical diversion to keep U-boats away from the loaded troop transports. Eleven of the ships surviving this convoy sailed two months later with convoy ON 154, in which four of them were sunk.

== Ships in convoy ==
| Name | Flag | Dead | Tonnage (GRT) | Cargo | Notes |
|---|---|---|---|---|---|
| Alaska (1918) | Norway | | 5,681 | | Torpedoed and damaged by U-510 on 31 Oct, while picking up survivors from Président Doumer and Tasmania which had been sunk earlier. She reached Lisbon safely on 11 Nov |
| Alexandre Andre (1928) | Belgium | | 5,322 | | |
| Amstelkerk (1929) | Netherlands | | 4,457 | | Romped 30 Oct |
| Anglo Maersk (1930) | United Kingdom | | 7,705 | | Straggled 19 Oct; torpedoed by U-509 26 Oct but survived; sunk by U-604 27 Oct |
| Baron Elgin (1933) | United Kingdom | | 3,942 | | Detached to Funchal; survived this convoy, convoy ON 154, convoy SC 122 & convoy ONS 5 |
| Baron Kinnaird (1927) | United Kingdom | | 3,355 | | |
| Baron Vernon (1929) | United Kingdom | 0 | 3,642 | 5,500 tons iron ore | Sunk by U-604 30 Oct. 0 dead. Survivors picked up by Baron Elgin |
| Belnor (1926) | Norway | | 2,871 | | Joined at sea 19 Oct |
| Bornholm (1930) | United Kingdom | | 3,177 | | Survived this convoy, convoy ON 154, & convoy ONS 5 |
| Bothnia (1928) | United Kingdom | | 2,407 | | Joined at sea 23 Oct, survived this convoy & convoy HX 228 |
| British Ardour (1928) | United Kingdom | | 7,124 | | Joined at sea 19 Oct as escort oiler |
| Brittany (1928) | United Kingdom | 14 | 4,772 | 7,132 tons general cargo | Veteran of convoy HX 79; sunk by U-509 28 Oct |
| Bullmouth (1927) | United Kingdom | 50 | 7,519 | Ballasted tanker | Torpedoed and damaged by U-409, then finally sunk by U-659 on 30 Oct. 50 of the 56 crew died. |
| Calgary (1921) | United Kingdom | | 7,206 | | Survived this convoy & convoy ON 154 |
| Clan Murray (1918) | United Kingdom | | 5,953 | | |
| Corinaldo (1921) | United Kingdom | 8 | 7,131 | 5,141 tons frozen meat | Damaged by both U-509 and U-659, then finally sunk by U-203 on 30 Oct. 8 dead. Survivors picked up by HMS Cowslip (K196) |
| Debrett (1940) | United Kingdom | | 6,244 | | |
| Dundrum Castle (1919) | United Kingdom | | 5,259 | | Veteran of convoy SC 42; survived this convoy & convoy ON 154 |
| Empire Cougar (1919) | United Kingdom | | 5,758 | | Arrived with engine defects & later survived convoy ON 154 |
| Empire Simba (1919) | United Kingdom | | 5,691 | | Survived this convoy & convoy ON 154 |
| Germa (1920) | Norway | | 5,282 | | |
| Guinean (1936) | United Kingdom | | 5,205 | | |
| Henry Stanley (1929) | United Kingdom | | 5,026 | | |
| Hopecastle (1937) | United Kingdom | 5 | 5,178 | 5,500 tons general cargo | Sunk by U-509 & U-203 29 Oct |
| King Edward (1919) | United Kingdom | | 5,224 | | Survived to be sunk 2 months later in convoy ON 154 |
| Lafonia (1911) | United Kingdom | | 1,961 | | |
| Lynton Grange (1937) | United Kingdom | | 5,029 | | Survived to be sunk 2 months later in convoy ON 154 |
| Mano (1925) | United Kingdom | | 1,418 | | Joined at sea 23 Oct; survived this convoy & convoy ONS 5 |
| Marquesa (1918) | United Kingdom | | 8,979 | | |
| Nagpore (1920) | United Kingdom | 19 | 5,283 | 1,500 tons copper & 5,500 tons general cargo | Carried convoy commodore RADM Sir C N Reyne KBE; sunk by U-509 28 Oct |
| Pacific Star (1920) | United Kingdom | 0 | 7,591 | 5,037 tons refrigerated meat & general cargo | Sunk by U-509 27 Oct |
| Président Doumer (1934) | United Kingdom | 260 | 11,898 | 63 passengers & general cargo | Troopship. Joined at sea 19 Oct; sunk by U-604 30 Oct |
| San Francisco (1915) | Sweden | | 4,933 | | |
| Sembilan (1922) | Netherlands | | 6,566 | | |
| Silver Willow (1930) | United Kingdom | 5 | 6,373 | 9,000 tons general cargo | Sunk by U-409 30 Oct |
| Stentor (1926) | United Kingdom | 44 | 6,148 | 6,000 tons West African produce | Carried convoy vice commodore Capt R H Garstin CBE RIN; sunk by U-509 27 Oct |
| Tasmania (1935) | United Kingdom | 2 | 6,405 | 8,500 tons food & iron | Sunk by U-103 31 Oct |
| Tynemouth (1940) | United Kingdom | | 3,168 | | Veteran of convoy SC 94; survived this convoy & convoy ON 154 |
| Ville de Rouen (1919) | United Kingdom | | 5,083 | | Survived to be sunk 2 months later in convoy ON 154 |
| Welsh Trader (1938) | United Kingdom | | 4,974 | | |
| West Kebar (1920) | United States | | 5,620 | | Detached 20 Oct |
| Zarian (1938) | United Kingdom | | 4,871 | | Survived, but was sunk 2 months later in convoy ON 154 |

== See also ==
- Convoy Battles of World War II
