= German submarine U-509 =

German World War II submarine

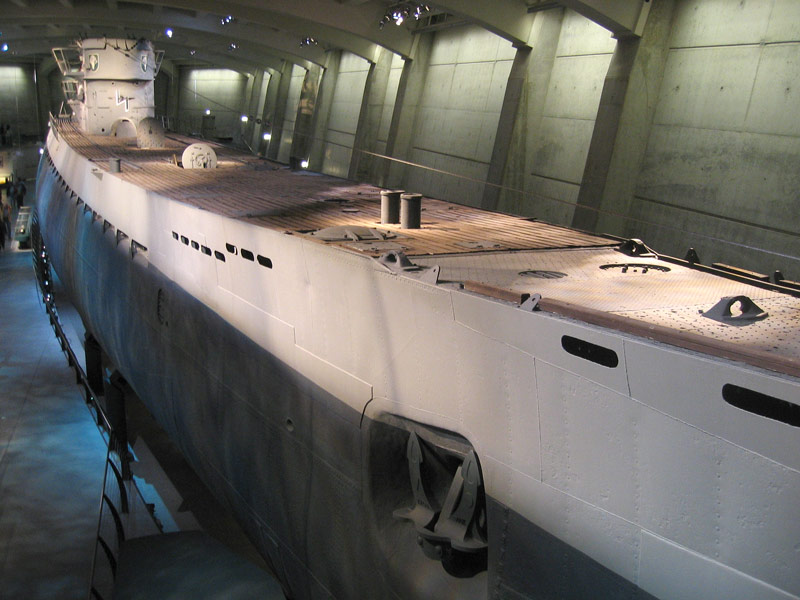
- U-505, a typical Type IXC boat

History

Nazi Germany
- Name: U-509
- Ordered: 20 October 1939
- Builder: Deutsche Werft, Hamburg
- Yard number: 305
- Laid down: 1 November 1940
- Launched: 19 August 1941
- Commissioned: 4 November 1941
- Fate: Sunk on 15 July 1943

General characteristics
- Class & type: Type IXC submarine
- Displacement: 1,120 t (1,100 long tons) surfaced; 1,232 t (1,213 long tons) submerged
- Length: 76.76 m (251 ft 10 in) o/a; 58.75 m (192 ft 9 in) pressure hull
- Beam: 6.76 m (22 ft 2 in) o/a; 4.40 m (14 ft 5 in) pressure hull
- Height: 9.60 m (31 ft 6 in)
- Draught: 4.70 m (15 ft 5 in)
- Installed power: 4,400 PS (3,200 kW; 4,300 bhp) (diesels); 1,000 PS (740 kW; 990 shp) (electric)
- Propulsion: 2 shafts; 2 × diesel engines; 2 × electric motors
- Speed: 18.3 knots (33.9 km/h; 21.1 mph) surfaced; 7.7 knots (14.3 km/h; 8.9 mph) submerged
- Range: 13,450 nmi (24,910 km; 15,480 mi) at 10 knots (19 km/h; 12 mph) surfaced; 64 nmi (119 km; 74 mi) at 4 knots (7.4 km/h; 4.6 mph) submerged
- Test depth: 230 m (750 ft)
- Complement: 4 officers, 44 enlisted
- Armament: 6 × torpedo tubes (4 bow, 2 stern); 22 × 53.3 cm (21 in) torpedoes; 1 × 10.5 cm (4.1 in) SK C/32 deck gun (180 rounds); 1 × 3.7 cm (1.5 in) SK C/30 AA gun; 1 × twin 2 cm FlaK 30 AA guns

Service record
- Part of: 4th U-boat Flotilla; 4 November 1941 – 30 June 1942; 10th U-boat Flotilla; 1 July 1942 – 15 July 1943
- Identification codes: M 37 143
- Commanders: K.Kapt. Karl-Heinz Wolff; 4 November 1941 – September 1942; K.Kapt. Werner Witte; September 1942 – 15 July 1943
- Operations: 4 patrols: 1st patrol: 25 June – 12 September 1942; 2nd patrol: 15 October – 26 November 1942; 3rd patrol: 23 December 1942 – 11 May 1943; 4th patrol: 3 – 15 July 1943
- Victories: 5 merchant ships sunk (29,091 GRT); 1 merchant ship total loss (7,129 GRT); 3 merchant ships damaged (20,014 GRT)

German submarine U-509 was a Type IXC U-boat of Nazi Germany's Kriegsmarine during World War II. The submarine was laid down on 1 November 1940 at the Deutsche Werft yard in Hamburg as yard number 305. She was launched on 19 August 1941, and commissioned on 4 November 1941 under the command of Korvettenkapitän Karl-Heinz Wolff.

The U-boat served with the 4th U-boat Flotilla for training, before being assigned to the 10th U-boat Flotilla from 1 July 1942, for front-line service.

== Design ==
German Type IXC submarines were slightly larger than the original Type IXBs. U-509 had a displacement of 1,120 tonnes (1,100 long tons) when at the surface and 1,232 tonnes (1,213 long tons) while submerged. The U-boat had a total length of 76.76 m (251 ft 10 in), a pressure hull length of 58.75 m (192 ft 9 in), a beam of 6.76 m (22 ft 2 in), a height of 9.60 m (31 ft 6 in), and a draught of 4.70 m (15 ft 5 in). The submarine was powered by two MAN M 9 V 40/46 supercharged four-stroke, nine-cylinder diesel engines producing a total of 4,400 metric horsepower (3,240 kW; 4,340 shp) for use while surfaced, two Siemens-Schuckert 2 GU 345/34 double-acting electric motors producing a total of 1,000 shaft horsepower (1,010 PS; 750 kW) for use while submerged. She had two shafts and two 1.92 m (6 ft) propellers. The boat was capable of operating at depths of up to 230 metres (750 ft).

The submarine had a maximum surface speed of 18.3 knots (33.9 km/h; 21.1 mph) and a maximum submerged speed of 7.3 knots (13.5 km/h; 8.4 mph). When submerged, the boat could operate for 63 nautical miles (117 km; 72 mi) at 4 knots (7.4 km/h; 4.6 mph); when surfaced, she could travel 13,450 nautical miles (24,910 km; 15,480 mi) at 10 knots (19 km/h; 12 mph). U-509 was fitted with six 53.3 cm (21 in) torpedo tubes (four fitted at the bow and two at the stern), 22 torpedoes, one 10.5 cm (4.13 in) SK C/32 naval gun, 180 rounds, and a 3.7 cm (1.5 in) SK C/30 as well as a 2 cm (0.79 in) C/30 anti-aircraft gun. The boat had a complement of forty-eight.

== Service history ==
=== First patrol ===
U-509 sailed from Kiel on 25 June 1942, across the Atlantic, into the Caribbean Sea and along the coast of South America, without any successes. She arrived at her new home port of Lorient in occupied France on 12 September after 80 days at sea.

=== Second patrol ===
U-509 departed from Lorient on 15 October 1942, now under the command of Oberleutnant zur See Werner Witte. Operating in the waters west of the Canary Islands as part of wolfpack Streitaxt (English : "Battle axe") she attacked Convoy SL 125, sinking four ships and damaging three more.

==== Convoy SL 125 ====
At 17:40 on 26 October the U-boat attacked the 7,705 GRT British tanker Anglo Mærsk, a straggler, with a single torpedo with no apparent effect. However the damaged ship was sunk at 21:06 the next day by U-604. The entire crew: master, 32 crewmen, and two gunners, landed at Hierro Island, Canary Islands, on 27 October.

At 22.33 and 22.38 hours on 27 October, U-509 fired torpedoes at the convoy and sank two British merchant ships. The 7,951 GRT Pacific Star did not sink immediately, but the crew abandoned ship, and she was last seen on 30 October, very low in the water, and probably sank shortly afterwards. The 6,148 GRT Stentor was the ship of the vice-commodore of the convoy Captain Richard Hart Garstin, CBE, RNR, and was carrying 125 passengers, including 26 army personnel, 11 nursing sisters and six naval staff members. The master, Vice-Commodore, 20 crewmen, three army personnel, four nurses and 15 passengers were lost. 93 crew members, seven gunners and 107 passengers were picked up by HMS Woodruff.

On 28 October, U-509 fired five torpedoes at the convoy and hit two more British merchant ships, while on 10 November, the fourth engineer and 18 men landed at La Orotava, Tenerife, Canary Islands, after being adrift for 14 days. The 5,178 GRT Hopecastle was badly damaged. Three crewmen and two gunners were lost, and her crew abandoned ship. The master and 20 survivors were picked up by the British merchant ship Mano, and another 19 survivors later landed at Funchal, Madeira. Around 05:00 on 29 October, the abandoned Hopecastle was hit by torpedoes from U-203, but the ship stayed afloat and was finally sunk at 10:10 by gunfire.

At 22:16 on 29 October 1942, the U-boat hit the 7,131 GRT British refrigerated cargo ship Corinaldo with one torpedo. The ship, laden with 5,141 tons of frozen meat from Buenos Aires, dropped out of the convoy and was abandoned. Seven crew members and one gunner were killed. The Master, 41 crewmen and eight gunners were rescued by HMS Cowslip. At 02:07 the next day, U-659 struck Corinaldo with two torpedoes, but she remained afloat. At 04:16 on the 30th, U-203 sank her with a torpedo and gunfire.

Finally, at midnight on 30 October the U-boat torpedoed and sank the 4,772 GRT British merchant ship Brittany near Madeira. Twelve crewmen, one gunner, and one passenger were lost. The master, 32 crewmen, seven gunners, and three passengers were picked up by the British auxiliary patrol vessel HMS Kelantan.

U-509 then sailed for the waters off Morocco to operate against the Allied ships taking part in the Operation Torch landings. The U-boat operated for three days in waters less than 200 feet (61 m) deep and was constantly bombed and depth charged by Allied surface vessels and aircraft. U-509 received some damage, forcing her to abort the patrol and return to Lorient on 26 November after 43 days at sea.

=== Third patrol ===
U-509's next patrol took her far south, to the waters off South Africa. Leaving Lorient on 23 December 1942, she made her first kill at 02:19 on 10 February, sinking the 4,937 GRT British merchant ship Queen Anne eight miles south-south-west of Cape Agulhas. The U-boat was attacked by the ASW trawler HMS St. Zeno with gunfire and seven depth charges, but was not damaged and made her escape. The master, two crewmen and two gunners from Queen Anne were lost. Eighteen survivors were picked up by St. Zeno, while 22 survivors later made landfall at Bredasdorp.

The U-boat struck again at 22:00 on 2 April, torpedoing the 7,129 GRT British passenger ship City of Baroda of Convoy NC-9 north-west of Cape Town. The badly damaged vessel was towed to Lüderitz Bay, South West Africa and beached. Later she broke in two, and was declared a total loss. One crewman and seven passengers were lost. The master, 124 crewmen, four gunners, and 196 passengers were picked up by HMS Cape Warwick.

U-509 returned to Lorient on 11 May after a voyage lasting 140 days.

=== Fourth patrol ===
The U-boat's final patrol began on 3 July 1943, under the command of the newly promoted Korvettenkapitän Werner Witte, and sailing south-west to the waters south of the Azores. There on 15 July, north-west of Madeira, in position 34°02′N 26°01′W, she was sunk with all hands by aerial FIDO torpedoes from a Grumman TBF Avenger bombers of Navy squadron VC-29 flying from the escort carrier USS Santee.

=== Wolfpacks ===
U-509 took part in two wolfpacks, namely:

- Streitaxt (20 October – 2 November 1942)
- Schlagetot (9 – 15 November 1942)

== Summary of raiding history ==
Date	Ship Name	Nationality	Tonnage (GRT)	Fate
26 October 1942	Anglo Mærsk	United Kingdom	7,705	Damaged
27 October 1942	Pacific Star	United Kingdom	7,951	Sunk
27 October 1942	Stentor	United Kingdom	6,148	Sunk
28 October 1942	Hopecastle	United Kingdom	5,178	Damaged
28 October 1942	Nagpore	United Kingdom	5,283	Sunk
29 October 1942	Corinaldo	United Kingdom	7,131	Damaged
30 October 1942	Brittany	United Kingdom	4,772	Sunk
10 February 1943	Queen Anne	United Kingdom	4,937	Sunk
2 April 1943	City of Baroda	United Kingdom	7,129	Total loss

== Bibliography ==
- Busch, Rainer; Röll, Hans-Joachim (1999). German U-boat commanders of World War II : a biographical dictionary. Translated by Brooks, Geoffrey. London, Annapolis, Md: Greenhill Books, Naval Institute Press. ISBN 1-55750-186-6.
- Busch, Rainer; Röll, Hans-Joachim (1999). Deutsche U-Boot-Verluste von September 1939 bis Mai 1945 [German U-boat losses from September 1939 to May 1945]. Der U-Boot-Krieg (in German). Vol. IV. Hamburg, Berlin, Bonn: Mittler. ISBN 3-8132-0514-2.
- Gröner, Erich; Jung, Dieter; Maass, Martin (1991). U-boats and Mine Warfare Vessels. German Warships 1815–1945. Vol. 2. Translated by Thomas, Keith; Magowan, Rachel. London: Conway Maritime Press. ISBN 0-85177-593-4.
- Kemp, Paul (1999). U-Boats Destroyed - German Submarine Losses in the World Wars. London: Arms & Armour. ISBN 1-85409-515-3.
