= Wolfpack Streitaxt =

- Active: 20 October 1942 - 2 November 1942
- Country: Nazi Germany
- Branch: Kriegsmarine
- Size: 10 submarines
- Engagements: Convoy SL 125

Commanders
- Notable commanders: Karl Neitzel

Streitaxt (Battleaxe) was a wolfpack of German U-boats that operated during the World War II Battle of the Atlantic from 20 October to 2 November 1942.

== Service ==
The group was responsible for sinking twelve merchant ships (80,005 gross register tons (GRT)) and damaging a further seven merchant ships (46,750 GRT).

=== Raiding History ===
Date	U-boat	Name of ship	Nationality	Tons	Convoy	Fate
26 October 1942	U-509	Anglo Mærsk	United Kingdom	7,705	SL-125	Damaged
27 October 1942	U-604	Anglo Mærsk	United Kingdom	7,705	SL-125	Sunk
27 October 1942	U-509	Pacific Star	United Kingdom	7,951	SL-125	Sunk
27 October 1942	U-509	Stentor	United Kingdom	6,148	SL-125	Sunk
28 October 1942	U-509	Hopecastle	United Kingdom	5,178	SL-125	Damaged
28 October 1942	U-509	Nagpore	United Kingdom	5,283	SL-125	Sunk
29 October 1942	U-509	Corinaldo	United Kingdom	7,131	SL-125	Damaged
29 October 1942	U-203	Hopecastle	United Kingdom	5,178	SL-125	Sunk
30 October 1942	U-604	Baron Vernon	United Kingdom	3,642	SL-125	Sunk
30 October 1942	U-509	Brittany	United Kingdom	4,772	SL-125	Sunk
30 October 1942	U-409	Bullmouth	United Kingdom	7,519	SL-125	Damaged
30 October 1942	U-659	Bullmouth	United Kingdom	7,519	SL-125	Sunk
30 October 1942	U-659	Corinaldo	United Kingdom	7,131	SL-125	Damaged
30 October 1942	U-203	Corinaldo	United Kingdom	7,131	SL-125	Sunk
30 October 1942	U-604	Président Doumer	United Kingdom	11,898	SL-125	Sunk
30 October 1942	U-409	Silverwillow	United Kingdom	6,373	SL-125	Sunk
30 October 1942	U-659	Tasmania	United Kingdom	6,405	SL-125	Damaged
31 October 1942	U-510	Alaska	Norway	5,681	SL-125	Damaged
31 October 1942	U-103	Tasmania	United Kingdom	6,405	SL-125	Sunk

=== U-boats ===
U-boat	Commander	From	To
U-103	Gustav-Adolf Janssen	29 October 1942	2 November 1942
U-134	Rudolf Schendel	20 October 1942	2 November 1942
U-203	Hermann Kottmann	20 October 1942	30 October 1942
U-409	Hanns-Ferdinand Massmann	20 October 1942	1 November 1942
U-440	Hans Geissler	29 October 1942	2 November 1942
U-509	Werner Witte	20 October 1942	2 November 1942
U-510	Karl Neitzel	20 October 1942	2 November 1942
U-572	Heinz Hirsacker	20 October 1942	2 November 1942
U-604	Horst Höltring	20 October 1942	31 October 1942
U-659	Hans Stock	20 October 1942	31 October 1942

== Bibliography ==
- Edwards, Bernard (1996). Dönitz and the Wolf Packs - The U-boats at War. Cassell Military Classics. pp. 117, 119, 123–125. ISBN 0-304-35203-9.
