= German submarine U-510 =

German World War II submarine

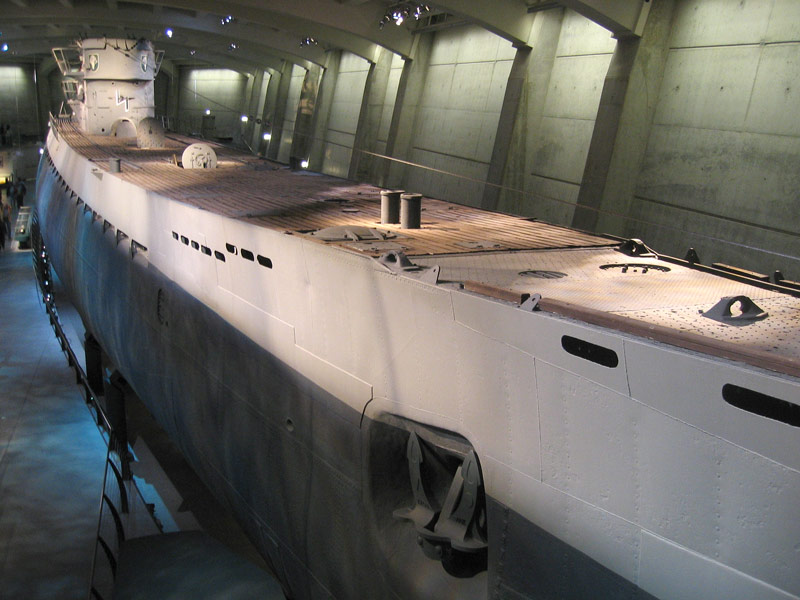
- U-505, a typical Type IXC boat

History

Nazi Germany
- Name: U-510
- Ordered: 20 October 1939
- Builder: Deutsche Werft, Hamburg
- Yard number: 306
- Laid down: 1 November 1940
- Launched: 4 September 1941
- Commissioned: 25 November 1941
- Captured: By United States Navy on 10 May 1945
- Fate: Awarded to French Navy in 1946

France
- Name: Bouan
- Acquired: 1946
- Commissioned: 24 June 1947
- Stricken: 1 May 1959
- Fate: Broken up in 1960

General characteristics
- Class & type: Type IXC submarine
- Displacement: 1,120 t (1,100 long tons) surfaced; 1,232 t (1,213 long tons) submerged
- Length: 76.76 m (251 ft 10 in) o/a; 58.75 m (192 ft 9 in) pressure hull
- Beam: 6.76 m (22 ft 2 in) o/a; 4.40 m (14 ft 5 in) pressure hull
- Height: 9.60 m (31 ft 6 in)
- Draught: 4.70 m (15 ft 5 in)
- Installed power: 4,400 PS (3,200 kW; 4,300 bhp) (diesels); 1,000 PS (740 kW; 990 shp) (electric)
- Propulsion: 2 shafts; 2 × diesel engines; 2 × electric motors
- Speed: 18.3 knots (33.9 km/h; 21.1 mph) surfaced; 7.7 knots (14.3 km/h; 8.9 mph) submerged
- Range: 13,450 nmi (24,910 km; 15,480 mi) at 10 knots (19 km/h; 12 mph) surfaced; 64 nmi (119 km; 74 mi) at 4 knots (7.4 km/h; 4.6 mph) submerged
- Test depth: 230 m (750 ft)
- Complement: 4 officers, 44 enlisted
- Armament: 6 × torpedo tubes (4 bow, 2 stern); 22 × 53.3 cm (21 in) torpedoes; 1 × 10.5 cm (4.1 in) SK C/32 deck gun (180 rounds); 1 × 3.7 cm (1.5 in) SK C/30 AA gun; 1 × twin 2 cm FlaK 30 AA guns

Service record (Kriegsmarine)
- Part of: 4th U-boat Flotilla; 25 November 1941 – 31 July 1942; 10th U-boat Flotilla; 1 August 1942 – 30 September 1944; 33rd U-boat Flotilla; 1 October 1944 – 8 May 1945
- Identification codes: M 42 702
- Commanders: K.Kapt. / F.Kapt. Karl Neitzel; 25 November 1941 – 21 May 1943; Kptlt. Alfred Eick; 22 May 1943 – 9 May 1945
- Operations: 7 patrols: 1st patrol: 7 July – 13 September 1942; 2nd patrol: 14 October – 12 December 1942; 3rd patrol: 16 January – 16 April 1943; 4th patrol: 3 June – 29 August 1943; 5th patrol: a. 3 November 1943 – 5 April 1944; b. 12 – 13 April 1944; c. 26 June – 7 July 1944; d. 7 – 19 October 1944; 6th patrol: 26 November – 3 December 1944; 7th patrol: 11 January – 23 April 1945
- Victories: 11 merchant ships sunk (71,100 GRT); 1 auxiliary warship sunk (249 GRT); 3 merchant ships total loss (24,338 GRT); 8 merchant ships damaged (53,289 GRT)

German submarine U-510 was a Type IXC U-boat of Nazi Germany's Kriegsmarine during World War II, which later served in the French Navy. The submarine was laid down on 1 November 1940 at the Deutsche Werft yard at Hamburg as yard number 306, launched on 4 September 1941, and commissioned on 25 November 1941 under the command of Korvettenkapitän Karl Neitzel.

After training with the 4th U-boat Flotilla at Stettin, U-510 was transferred to the 10th U-boat Flotilla based at Lorient in occupied France, for front-line service on 1 August 1942. Kapitänleutnant Alfred Eick took command of the U-boat on 22 May 1943, and she was transferred to the 33rd flotilla on 1 October 1944 while operating in Southeast Asian waters. During her seven war patrols the U-boat sank twelve ships totalling 71,349 gross register tons (GRT), damaged eight, totalling 53,289 GRT and cause three total loss, totalling 24,338 GRT.

The U-boat was captured by American forces at Saint-Nazaire on 10 May 1945. Renamed Bouan she served in the French Navy from 1947 until struck on 1 May 1959. The submarine was broken up in 1960.

== Design ==
German Type IXC submarines were slightly larger than the original Type IXBs. U-510 had a displacement of 1,120 tonnes (1,100 long tons) when at the surface and 1,232 tonnes (1,213 long tons) while submerged. The U-boat had a total length of 76.76 m (251 ft 10 in), a pressure hull length of 58.75 m (192 ft 9 in), a beam of 6.76 m (22 ft 2 in), a height of 9.60 m (31 ft 6 in), and a draught of 4.70 m (15 ft 5 in). The submarine was powered by two MAN M 9 V 40/46 supercharged four-stroke, nine-cylinder diesel engines producing a total of 4,400 metric horsepower (3,240 kW; 4,340 shp) for use while surfaced, two Siemens-Schuckert 2 GU 345/34 double-acting electric motors producing a total of 1,000 shaft horsepower (1,010 PS; 750 kW) for use while submerged. She had two shafts and two 1.92 m (6 ft) propellers. The boat was capable of operating at depths of up to 230 metres (750 ft).

The submarine had a maximum surface speed of 18.3 knots (33.9 km/h; 21.1 mph) and a maximum submerged speed of 7.3 knots (13.5 km/h; 8.4 mph). When submerged, the boat could operate for 63 nautical miles (117 km; 72 mi) at 4 knots (7.4 km/h; 4.6 mph); when surfaced, she could travel 13,450 nautical miles (24,910 km; 15,480 mi) at 10 knots (19 km/h; 12 mph). U-510 was fitted with six 53.3 cm (21 in) torpedo tubes (four fitted at the bow and two at the stern), 22 torpedoes, one 10.5 cm (4.13 in) SK C/32 naval gun with 180 rounds, as well as two anti-aircraft guns, one of 3.7 cm (1.5 in) SK C/30 and one of 2 cm (0.79 in) C/30. The boat had a complement of forty-eight men.

== Service history ==
=== First patrol ===
U-510 departed Kiel on 7 July 1942, negotiated the gap between Iceland and the Faroe Islands and sailed across the Atlantic to the northern coast of South America. There she attacked three ships and sank the 5,285 GRT Uruguayan merchant ship Maldonado on 2 August. She also damaged the 8,016 GRT British tanker Alexia on 10 August, and sank the 4,971 GRT British merchant ship Cressington Court on 19 August. The U-boat docked at Lorient on 13 September.

=== Second patrol ===
U-510 departed Lorient on 14 October 1942 and patrolled the waters west of the Canary Islands. On 31 October she torpedoed and damaged the 5,681 GRT Norwegian merchant ship Alaska of Convoy SL 125 while the ship was rescuing men from the troopship Président Doumer, which had been sunk by U-604. After "Operation Torch" began on 8 November, The boat was ordered to patrol the coast of Morocco, but was bombed by an unidentified aircraft, causing a serious oil leak. She returned to Lorient on 12 December.

=== Third patrol ===
The U-boat sailed from Lorient once more on 16 January 1943 and headed across the Atlantic to the northern coast of South America. On 9 March at 03:00, U-510 attacked Convoy BT-6 about 200 nautical miles (370 km; 230 mi) north-east of Paramaribo, Dutch Guiana, sinking the 3,872 GRT British merchant ship Kelvinbank, and damaging the 7,176 GRT American Liberty ships George G. Meade, Tabitha Brown and Joseph Rodman Drake. She attacked the same convoy again three hours later and this time damaged the Liberty ships Mark Hanna, James Smith, Thomas Ruffin and James K. Polk, the latter two so badly that they were later declared total losses. The U-boat returned to Lorient on 16 April.

=== Fourth patrol ===
Now under the command of Oberleutnant zur See Alfred Eick, U-510 sailed from Lorient on 3 June 1943 and once again headed for the northern South American coast. On 8 July she made a series of attacks on Convoy TJ-1, sinking the 10,324 GRT Norwegian tanker B.P. Newton and the 6,900 GRT American merchant ship Eldena, and damaging the 3,702 GRT Latvian merchant ship Everagra. Two days later, on 10 May, she sank the 1,641 GRT Swedish merchant ship Scandinavia. The U-boat returned to Lorient on 29 August.

=== Fifth patrol ===
U-510 left Lorient on 3 November 1943, sailed around the Cape of Good Hope and into the Indian Ocean to operate off the Arabian Peninsula.

On 22 February 1944, she made two attacks on Convoy PA-69 about 200 miles off Aden, sinking the 9,181 GRT American tanker E.G. Seubert and the 7,385 GRT British tanker San Alvaro; she also damaged the 9,970 GRT Norwegian tanker Erling Brøvig.

The U-boat then shaped a course for Penang in Malaya (now Malaysia), making three more attacks en route. On 7 March she torpedoed and sank the unescorted 7,229 GRT Norwegian merchant ship Tarifa about 250 miles east of Socotra in the Indian Ocean. On 19 March she sank the American 7,176 GRT Liberty ship John A. Poor in the Arabian Sea, and on 27 March the 249 GRT British naval trawler HMS Maaløy (J136) off Ceylon (now Sri Lanka), killing Prince Hassan Farid Didi, the son of HRH Abdul Majeed Didi, Sultan Elect of the Maldives, who was aboard as a passenger. Prince Hassan was Minister of the Interior and de facto head of the Government of the Sultanate of the Maldives. U-510 arrived at Penang on 5 April after a voyage of 155 days, her longest patrol.

=== Sixth patrol ===
Operating as part of the Monsun Gruppe U-510 sailed to Singapore and then to Kobe, Japan, before returning to Batavia (now Jakarta). From there, on 26 November 1944, she sailed on her only combat patrol, returning to Batavia on 3 December having had no successes.

=== Seventh patrol ===
U-510 left Batavia on 11 January 1945 for the voyage back to Europe. U-510 carried with her a load of tungsten, tin, quinine, etc. from the Far East.

On 23 February she sank the unescorted 7,136 GRT Canadian merchant ship SS Point Pleasant Park about 500 nautical miles (930 km; 580 mi) north-west of Cape Town.

After being supplied with oil southeast of Madagascar by KKpt Oesten's U-861, which was short of fuel herself, U-510 ran out of fuel in the North Atlantic, but somehow managed to reach base at Saint-Nazaire, in France, on 23 April after 103 days at sea.

=== Post war ===
American forces captured U-510 at Saint-Nazaire on 10 May 1945. Awarded to the French in 1946, she was commissioned into the French Navy, and renamed Bouan (S.612) on 24 June 1947. She served until struck on 1 May 1959, renamed hull Q.176 on 23 November 1959, and was broken up in 1960.

=== Wolfpacks ===
U-510 took part in two wolfpacks, namely:

- Streitaxt (20 October – 2 November 1942)
- Schlagetot (9 – 21 November 1942)

== Summary of raiding history ==
Date	Ship Name	Nationality	Tonnage (GRT)	Fate
2 August 1942	Maldonado	Uruguay	5,285	Sunk
10 August 1942	Alexia	United Kingdom	8,016	Damaged
19 August 1942	Cressington Court	United Kingdom	4,971	Sunk
31 October 1942	Alaska	Norway	5,681	Damaged
9 March 1943	George C. Meade	United States	7,176	Damaged
9 March 1943	James K. Polk	United States	7,177	Total loss
9 March 1943	James Smith	United States	7,181	Damaged
9 March 1943	James Rodman Drake	United States	7,181	Damaged
9 March 1943	Kelvinbank	United Kingdom	3,872	Sunk
9 March 1943	Mark Hanna	United States	7,176	Damaged
9 March 1943	Tabitha Brown	United States	7,176	Damaged
9 March 1943	Thomas Ruffin	United States	7,191	Total loss
8 July 1943	B. P. Newton	Norway	10,324	Sunk
8 July 1943	Eldena	United States	6,900	Sunk
8 July 1943	Everagra	Latvia	3,702	Damaged
10 July 1943	Scandinavia	Sweden	1,641	Sunk
22 February 1944	E. G. Seubert	United States	9,181	Sunk
22 February 1944	Erling Brøving	Norway	9,970	Total loss
22 February 1944	San Alvaro	United Kingdom	7,385	Sunk
7 March 1944	Tarifa	Norway	7,229	Sunk
7 March 1944	John A. Poor	United States	7,176	Sunk
27 March 1944	HMS Maaløy	Royal Navy	249	Sunk
23 February 1945	Point Pleasant Park	Canada	7,136	Sunk

== Bibliography ==
- Busch, Rainer; Röll, Hans-Joachim (1999). German U-boat commanders of World War II : a biographical dictionary. Translated by Brooks, Geoffrey. London, Annapolis, Md: Greenhill Books, Naval Institute Press. ISBN 1-55750-186-6.
- Busch, Rainer; Röll, Hans-Joachim (1999). Deutsche U-Boot-Verluste von September 1939 bis Mai 1945 [German U-boat losses from September 1939 to May 1945]. Der U-Boot-Krieg (in German). Vol. IV. Hamburg; Berlin; Bonn: Mittler. ISBN 3-8132-0514-2.
- Gröner, Erich; Jung, Dieter; Maass, Martin (1991). U-boats and Mine Warfare Vessels. German Warships 1815–1945. Vol. 2. Translated by Thomas, Keith; Magowan, Rachel. London: Conway Maritime Press. ISBN 0-85177-593-4.
