= K222 =

K222 or K-222 may refer to:

- K-222 (1960–1962 Kansas highway)
- K-222 (1960–2000 Kansas highway)
- HMS Teviot (K222), a former UK Royal Navy ship
- Soviet submarine K-222, a former Soviet Union submarine
