= German submarine U-149 (1940) =

German World War II submarine

History

Nazi Germany
- Name: U-149
- Ordered: 25 September 1939
- Builder: Deutsche Werke, Kiel
- Yard number: 278
- Laid down: 25 May 1940
- Launched: 19 October 1940
- Commissioned: 13 November 1940
- Fate: Surrendered on 5 May 1945; Scuttled on 21 December 1945 during Operation Deadlight

General characteristics
- Class & type: Type IID coastal submarine
- Displacement: 314 t (309 long tons) surfaced; 364 t (358 long tons) submerged
- Length: 43.97 m (144 ft 3 in) o/a; 29.80 m (97 ft 9 in) pressure hull
- Beam: 4.92 m (16 ft 2 in) o/a; 4.00 m (13 ft 1 in) pressure hull
- Height: 8.40 m (27 ft 7 in)
- Draught: 3.93 m (12 ft 11 in)
- Installed power: 700 PS (510 kW; 690 bhp) (diesels); 410 PS (300 kW; 400 shp) (electric)
- Propulsion: 2 shafts; 2 × diesel engines; 2 × electric motors
- Speed: 12.7 knots (23.5 km/h; 14.6 mph) surfaced; 7.4 knots (13.7 km/h; 8.5 mph) submerged
- Range: 3,450 nmi (6,390 km; 3,970 mi) at 12 knots (22 km/h; 14 mph) surfaced; 56 nmi (104 km; 64 mi) at 4 knots (7.4 km/h; 4.6 mph) submerged
- Test depth: 80 m (260 ft)
- Complement: 3 officers, 22 men
- Armament: 3 × 53.3 cm (21 in) torpedo tubes; 5 × torpedoes or up to 12 TMA or 18 TMB mines; 1 × 2 cm (0.79 in) C/30 anti-aircraft gun

Service record
- Part of: 1st U-boat Flotilla; 13 November – 31 December 1940; 22nd U-boat Flotilla; 1 January 1941 – 5 May 1945
- Identification codes: M 16 105
- Commanders: Oblt.z.S. / Kptlt. Horst Höltring; 13 November 1940 – 30 November 1941; Kptlt. Rolf Borchers; 1 December 1941 – 31 July 1942; Oblt.z.S. Adolf-Whilhelm von Hammerstein-Equord; 1 August 1942 – 14 May 1944; Oblt.z.S. Helmut Plohr; 15 May 1944 – 5 May 1945
- Operations: 1 Patrol: 18 June - 11 July 1941
- Victories: 1 warship sunk (206 tons)

German submarine U-149 was a Type IID U-boat of Nazi Germany's Kriegsmarine during World War II. Her keel was laid down on 25 May 1940 by Deutsche Werke in Kiel as yard number 278. She was launched on 19 October 1940 and commissioned on 13 November with Kapitänleutnant Horst Höltring in command.

U-149 began her service life with the 1st U-boat Flotilla. She was then assigned to the 22nd flotilla, where she remained for the rest of the war, including time on a single patrol.

She surrendered on 5 May 1945 and was sunk as part of Operation Deadlight on 21 December.

== Design ==
German Type IID submarines were enlarged versions of the original Type IIs. U-149 had a displacement of 314 tonnes (309 long tons) when at the surface and 364 tonnes (358 long tons) while submerged. Officially, the standard tonnage was 250 long tons (254 t), however. The U-boat had a total length of 43.97 m (144 ft 3 in), a pressure hull length of 29.80 m (97 ft 9 in), a beam of 4.92 m (16 ft 2 in), a height of 8.40 m (27 ft 7 in), and a draught of 3.93 m (12 ft 11 in). The submarine was powered by two MWM RS 127 S four-stroke, six-cylinder diesel engines of 700 metric horsepower (510 kW; 690 shp) for cruising, two Siemens-Schuckert PG VV 322/36 double-acting electric motors producing a total of 410 metric horsepower (300 kW; 400 shp) for use while submerged. She had two shafts and two 0.85 m (3 ft) propellers. The boat was capable of operating at depths of up to 80–150 metres (260–490 ft).

The submarine had a maximum surface speed of 12.7 knots (23.5 km/h; 14.6 mph) and a maximum submerged speed of 7.4 knots (13.7 km/h; 8.5 mph). When submerged, the boat could operate for 35–42 nautical miles (65–78 km; 40–48 mi) at 4 knots (7.4 km/h; 4.6 mph); when surfaced, she could travel 3,800 nautical miles (7,000 km; 4,400 mi) at 8 knots (15 km/h; 9.2 mph). U-149 was fitted with three 53.3 cm (21 in) torpedo tubes at the bow, five torpedoes or up to twelve Type A torpedo mines, and a 2 cm (0.79 in) anti-aircraft gun. The boat had a complement of 25.

== Operational career ==
U-149's one patrol was carried out within the confines of the Baltic Sea, but she did sink the Soviet submarine M-99 on 27 July 1941, north-west of Dagö Island before returning to her base at Gotenhafen, (now Gdynia in modern Poland).

=== Fate ===
The boat surrendered at the German island of Heligoland on 5 May 1945. She was transferred from Wilhelmshaven to Loch Ryan in preparation for Operation Deadlight and was sunk on 21 December 1945 at 55°40′N 08°00′W.

== Summary of raiding history ==
Date	Ship	Nationality	Tonnage (Note: Merchant ship tonnages are in gross register tons. Military vessels are listed by tons displacement.)	Fate
27 June 1941	M-99	Soviet Navy	206	Sunk

== Bibliography ==
- Busch, Rainer; Röll, Hans-Joachim (1999). German U-boat commanders of World War II : a biographical dictionary. Translated by Brooks, Geoffrey. London, Annapolis, Md: Greenhill Books, Naval Institute Press. ISBN 1-55750-186-6.
- Busch, Rainer; Röll, Hans-Joachim (1999). Deutsche U-Boot-Verluste von September 1939 bis Mai 1945 [German U-boat losses from September 1939 to May 1945]. Der U-Boot-Krieg (in German). Vol. IV. Hamburg, Berlin, Bonn: Mittler. ISBN 3-8132-0514-2.
- Gröner, Erich; Jung, Dieter; Maass, Martin (1991). U-boats and Mine Warfare Vessels. German Warships 1815–1945. Vol. 2. Translated by Thomas, Keith; Magowan, Rachel. London: Conway Maritime Press. ISBN 0-85177-593-4.
