= Rolf Mützelburg =

German U-boat commander

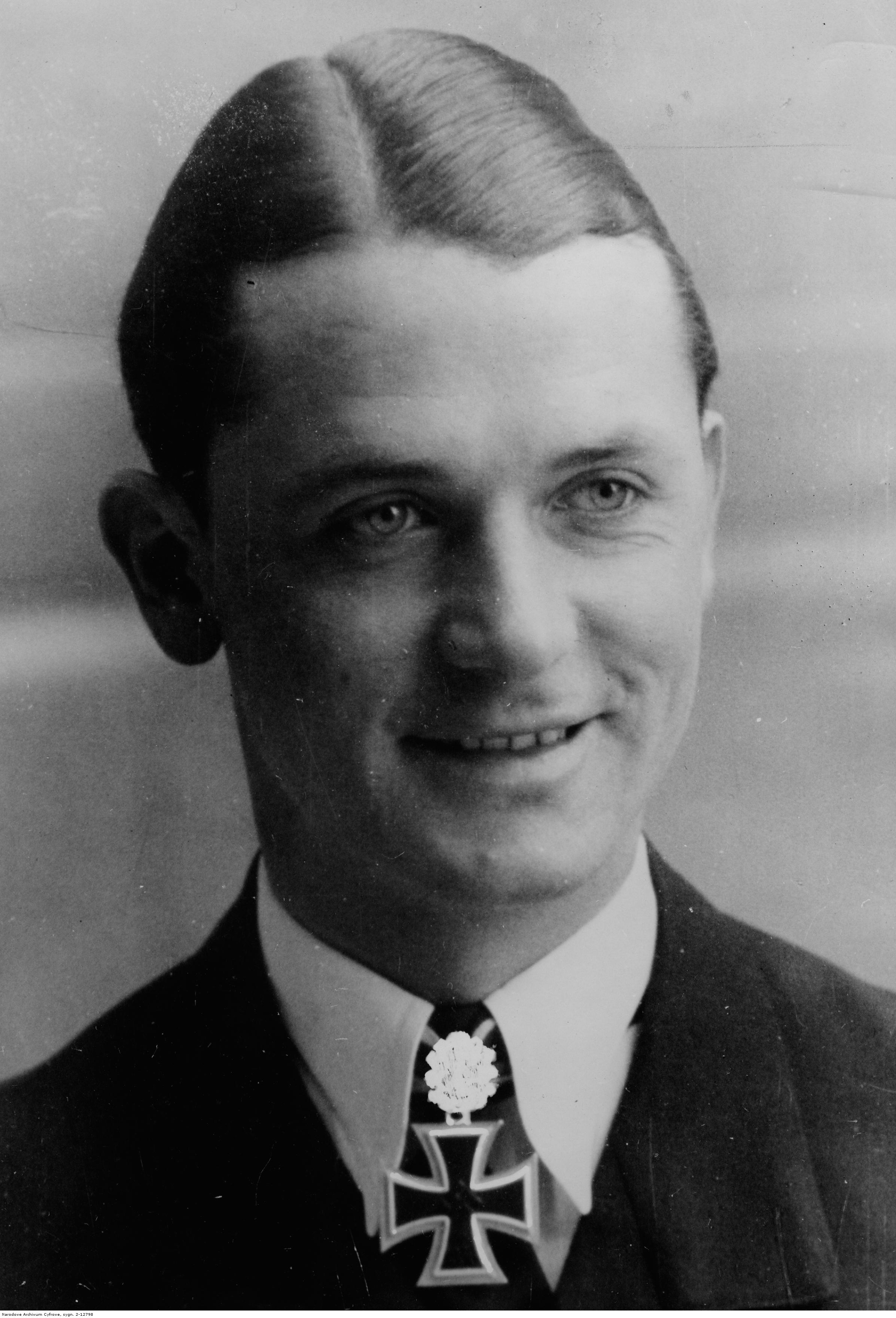
- Born: 23 June 1913; Kiel
- Died: 11 September 1942 (aged 29); U-203, Atlantic Ocean, off Azores; 36°14′N 31°21′W
- Military career
- Allegiance: Weimar Republic; Nazi Germany
- Branch: Reichsmarine; Kriegsmarine
- Service years: 1931–42
- Rank: Kapitänleutnant
- Units: 21st U-boat Flotilla; 1st U-boat Flotilla
- Commands: U-10; U-203
- Conflicts: World War II: Battle of the Atlantic
- Awards: Knight's Cross of the Iron Cross with Oak Leaves

Rolf Mützelburg (23 June 1913 – 11 September 1942) was a German U-boat commander during World War II and a recipient of the Knight's Cross of the Iron Cross with Oak Leaves of Nazi Germany. Mützelburg died on active service on 11 September 1942 following an accident at sea.

== Career ==
Mützelburg joined the Reichsmarine of the Weimar Republic on 1 April 1932 as member of "Crew 32" (the incoming class of 1932). After spending two years on minesweepers, in October 1939 he joined the U-boat arm. He spent five months commanding the school boat U-10 from June to November 1940 as part of 21st U-boat Flotilla, receiving his first combat experience aboard U-100 under Joachim Schepke. He commissioned U-203 into 1st U-boat Flotilla in February 1941. On his eight patrols in the Atlantic, the US east coast, and the Caribbean Sea, he sank 19 ships for a total of 81,961 gross register tons (GRT), and damaged three more (17,052 GRT).

Mützelburg died on 11 September 1942 in an accident. He was swimming in the Atlantic south-west of the Azores, and dived from the conning tower, but struck the deck head-first when the U-boat suddenly lurched in a swell. A supply U-boat, U-462, arrived the next day with a doctor on board. But it was too late, and Mützelburg was buried at sea on 12 September 1942.

== Awards ==
- Wehrmacht Long Service Award 4th Class (15 August 1936)
- Iron Cross (1939) 2nd Class (1 July 1941) & 1st Class (1 July 1941)
- U-boat War Badge (1939) (1 July 1941)
- Knight's Cross of the Iron Cross with Oak Leaves
  - Knight's Cross on 17 November 1941 as Kapitänleutnant and commander of U-203
  - Oak Leaves on 15 July 1942 as Kapitänleutnant and commander of U-203
