= German submarine U-439 =

German World War II submarine

History

Nazi Germany
- Name: U-439
- Ordered: 5 January 1940
- Builder: Schichau-Werke, Danzig
- Yard number: 1490
- Laid down: 1 October 1940
- Launched: 11 October 1941
- Commissioned: 20 December 1941
- Fate: Sunk on 4 May 1943 in the North Atlantic in position 43°32′N 13°20′W after colliding with U-659.

General characteristics
- Class & type: Type VIIC submarine
- Displacement: 769 tonnes (757 long tons) surfaced; 871 t (857 long tons) submerged
- Length: 67.10 m (220 ft 2 in) o/a; 50.50 m (165 ft 8 in) pressure hull
- Beam: 6.20 m (20 ft 4 in) o/a; 4.70 m (15 ft 5 in) pressure hull
- Height: 9.60 m (31 ft 6 in)
- Draught: 4.74 m (15 ft 7 in)
- Installed power: 2,800–3,200 PS (2,100–2,400 kW; 2,800–3,200 bhp) (diesels); 750 PS (550 kW; 740 shp) (electric)
- Propulsion: 2 shafts; 2 × diesel engines; 2 × electric motors
- Speed: 17.7 knots (32.8 km/h; 20.4 mph) surfaced; 7.6 knots (14.1 km/h; 8.7 mph) submerged
- Range: 8,500 nmi (15,700 km; 9,800 mi) at 10 knots (19 km/h; 12 mph) surfaced; 80 nmi (150 km; 92 mi) at 4 knots (7.4 km/h; 4.6 mph) submerged
- Test depth: 230 m (750 ft); Crush depth: 250–295 m (820–968 ft)
- Complement: 4 officers, 40–56 enlisted
- Armament: 5 × 53.3 cm (21 in) torpedo tubes (four bow, one stern); 14 × torpedoes; 1 × 8.8 cm (3.46 in) deck gun (220 rounds); 1 x 2 cm (0.79 in) C/30 AA gun

Service record
- Part of: 5th U-boat Flotilla; 20 December 1941 – 31 October 1942; 1st U-boat Flotilla; 1 November 1942 – 4 May 1943
- Identification codes: M 47 968
- Commanders: Kptlt. Wolfgang Sporn; 20 December 1941 – 17 February 1943; Oblt.z.S. Helmut von Tippelskirch; 18 February – 4 May 1943
- Operations: 4 patrols: 1st patrol: 12 November – 24 December 1942; 2nd patrol: 28 January – 2 February 1943; 3rd patrol: 22 February – 28 March 1943; 4th patrol: 27 April – 4 May 1943
- Victories: None

German submarine U-439 was a Type VIIC U-boat of Nazi Germany's Kriegsmarine during World War II.

She carried out four patrols. She sank no ships.

She was a member of six wolfpacks.

She was sunk after a collision with another U-boat when both were stalking a Gibraltar convoy on 4 May 1943.

== Design ==
German Type VIIC submarines were preceded by the shorter Type VIIB submarines. U-439 had a displacement of 769 tonnes (757 long tons) when at the surface and 871 tonnes (857 long tons) while submerged. She had a total length of 67.10 m (220 ft 2 in), a pressure hull length of 50.50 m (165 ft 8 in), a beam of 6.20 m (20 ft 4 in), a height of 9.60 m (31 ft 6 in), and a draught of 4.74 m (15 ft 7 in). The submarine was powered by two Germaniawerft F46 four-stroke, six-cylinder supercharged diesel engines producing a total of 2,800 to 3,200 metric horsepower (2,060 to 2,350 kW; 2,760 to 3,160 shp) for use while surfaced, two AEG GU 460/8–27 double-acting electric motors producing a total of 750 metric horsepower (550 kW; 740 shp) for use while submerged. She had two shafts and two 1.23 m (4 ft) propellers. The boat was capable of operating at depths of up to 230 metres (750 ft).

The submarine had a maximum surface speed of 17.7 knots (32.8 km/h; 20.4 mph) and a maximum submerged speed of 7.6 knots (14.1 km/h; 8.7 mph). When submerged, the boat could operate for 80 nautical miles (150 km; 92 mi) at 4 knots (7.4 km/h; 4.6 mph); when surfaced, she could travel 8,500 nautical miles (15,700 km; 9,800 mi) at 10 knots (19 km/h; 12 mph). U-439 was fitted with five 53.3 cm (21 in) torpedo tubes (four fitted at the bow and one at the stern), fourteen torpedoes, one 8.8 cm (3.46 in) SK C/35 naval gun, 220 rounds, and a 2 cm (0.79 in) C/30 anti-aircraft gun. The boat had a complement of between forty-four and sixty.

== Service history ==
The submarine was laid down on 1 October 1940 at Schichau-Werke in Danzig (now Gdansk, Poland) as yard number 1490, launched on 11 October 1941 and commissioned on 20 December under the command of Oberleutnant zur See Wolfgang Sporn.

She served with the 5th U-boat Flotilla from 20 December 1941 for training and the 1st flotilla from 1 November 1942 for operations.

=== First patrol ===
U-439's first patrol was from Kiel in Germany. She headed for the Atlantic Ocean, via the gap separating the Faroe and Shetland Islands. She arrived at Brest in occupied France on 24 December.

=== Second and third patrols ===
For her second sortie, she barely got out of the Bay of Biscay.

Her third foray took her into the middle of the North Atlantic.

=== Fourth patrol and loss ===
Having left Brest on 27 April 1943, she, and U-659 were shadowing a southbound convoy on 4 May in preparation for an attack on the surface when the two U-boats collided. Both boats sank.

Forty men went down with U-439; there were nine survivors.

=== Wolfpacks ===
U-439 took part in six wolfpacks, namely:

- Panzer (23 November – 11 December 1942)
- Raufbold (11 – 15 December 1942)
- Neuland (4 – 6 March 1943)
- Ostmark (6 – 11 March 1943)
- Stürmer (11 – 19 March 1943)
- Drossel (29 April – 4 May 1943)

== Bibliography ==
- Busch, Rainer; Röll, Hans-Joachim (1999). German U-boat commanders of World War II : a biographical dictionary. Translated by Brooks, Geoffrey. London, Annapolis, Md: Greenhill Books, Naval Institute Press. ISBN 1-55750-186-6.
- Busch, Rainer; Röll, Hans-Joachim (1999). Deutsche U-Boot-Verluste von September 1939 bis Mai 1945 [German U-boat losses from September 1939 to May 1945]. Der U-Boot-Krieg (in German). Vol. IV. Hamburg, Berlin, Bonn: Mittler. ISBN 3-8132-0514-2.
- Edwards, Bernard (1996). Dönitz and the Wolf Packs – The U-boats at War. Cassell Military Classics. p. 189. ISBN 0-304-35203-9.
- Gröner, Erich; Jung, Dieter; Maass, Martin (1991). U-boats and Mine Warfare Vessels. German Warships 1815–1945. Vol. 2. Translated by Thomas, Keith; Magowan, Rachel. London: Conway Maritime Press. ISBN 0-85177-593-4.
- Kemp, Paul (1999). U-Boats Destroyed – German Submarine Losses in the World Wars. London: Arms & Armour. ISBN 1-85409-515-3.
