= Convoy OG 69 =

Convoy during naval battles of the Second World War

Convoy OG.69
- Part of World War II
Date	19 July – 1 August 1941
Location	North Atlantic
Result	Axis victory

Belligerents
Germany Italy	United Kingdom

Commanders and leaders
Admiral Karl Dönitz	

Strength
8 U-boats; 2 Italian submarines	28 merchant ships 17 escorts

Casualties and losses
	9 ships sunk 68 killed

Convoy OG 69 was a trade convoy of merchant ships during the second World War. It was the 69th of the numbered OG convoys Outbound from the British Isles to Gibraltar. The convoy departed Liverpool on 20 July 1941 and was found on 25 July by Focke-Wulf Fw 200 Condors of Kampfgeschwader 40. Nine ships were sunk by submarine attacks continuing through 30 July.

== Submarines ==
The convoy was initially located by German Naval signals intelligence (B-Dienst), then visual confirmation was provided by a Focke-Wulf Fw 200 aircraft. A total of 10 boats were directed to intercept the convoy – eight U-boats from Nazi Germany's Kriegsmarine and two submarines from Fascist Italy's Regia Marina.

Name	Type	First contact	Ships sunk	Ships damaged	Notes
U-68	IXC	26 July 1940	none		
U-79	VIIC	26/27 July 1940	Kelwin		
U-126	IXC	26/27 July 1940	Erato, Inga I,		
U-203	VIIC	26/27 July 1940	Hawkinge, Lapland, Norita		
U-331	VIIC	none	none		
U-561	VIIC	27 July 1940	Wrotham		
U-562	VIIC	none	none		
U-564	VIIC	none	none		
Barbarigo	Marcello-class submarine	22 July 1940	none		
Pietro Calvi	Calvi-class submarine	none	none		

== Ships in the convoy ==
=== Allied merchant ships ===
A total of 28 merchant vessels joined the convoy in Liverpool, with some being sunk after detaching from the convoy to head to other destinations.

Name	Flag	Tonnage (GRT)	Notes
Adjutant (1922)	United Kingdom	1,931	Bound for Gibraltar
Afghanistan (1940)	United Kingdom	6,992	Bound for Cape Town
Arabistan (1929)	United Kingdom	5,874	Bound for Cape Town
Charlbury (1940)	United Kingdom	4,836	Bound for Rio de Janeiro
City of Lyons (1926)	United Kingdom	7,063	Bound for Cape Town
Como (1910)	United Kingdom	1,295	Bound for Lisbon
Dayrose (1928)	United Kingdom	4,113	In ballast
Empire Dawn (1941)	United Kingdom	7,241	Bound for Cape Town
Empire Voice (1940)	United Kingdom	6,828	Bound for Cape Town
Erato (1923)	United Kingdom	1,335	Sunk by U-126 on 27 July. There were nine dead. The survivors, including the ship's master, were picked up by HMS Begonia and landed at Gibraltar. Capt C M Ford Rd RNR (Commodore)
Hawkinge (1924)	United Kingdom	2,475	Sunk by U-203 on 27 July. There were 15 dead. Survivors were picked up by HMS Sunflower and HMS Vanoc.
Inga I (1921)	Norway	1,304	Torpedoed, broke in two, and sunk by U-126 on 27 July. There were nine dead. The survivors were picked up by one of the escorts and landed at Gibraltar.
Kellwyn (1920)	United Kingdom	1,459	Sunk by U-79 on 27 July. There were 14 dead. The nine survivors were picked up by HMT St Nectan.
Lapland (1936)	United Kingdom	1,330	Sunk by U-203 on 28 July. There were no dead. Survivors were picked up by HMS Rhododendron.
Larchbank (1925)	United Kingdom	5,151	Bound for Cape Town
Norita (1924)	Sweden	1,516	Sunk by U-203 on 28 July. There were two dead.
Pelayo (1927)	United Kingdom	1,345	Bound for Gibraltar
Rhineland (1922)	United Kingdom	1,381	Bound for Lisbon
Romney (1929)	United Kingdom	5,840	Bound for Alexandria
Ruth I (1900)	Norway	3,531	Bound for Cádiz
Shahristan (1945)	United Kingdom	7,309	68 passengers. Bound for Cape Town. Sunk by U-371 on 30 July southeast of the Azores, after detaching from the convoy.
Sheaf Crown (1929)	United Kingdom	4,868	Bound for Huelva
Shuna (1937)	United Kingdom	1,575	Returned
Sitoebondo (1916)	Netherlands	7,049	Bound for Cape Town. Sunk by U-371 on 30 July after detaching from the convoy. There were 19 dead.
Thistlegorm (1940)	United Kingdom	4,898	Bound for Cape Town
Tintern Abbey (1939)	United Kingdom	2,471	
Wrotham (1927)	United Kingdom	1,884	Torpedoed, and sank in 30 seconds, by U-561 on 27 July. There were no dead. The nine survivors were picked up by HMS Fleur de Lys and HMS Rhododendron and landed at Gibraltar.
Yorkwood (1936)	United Kingdom	5,401	Bound for Cape Town

=== Convoy escorts ===
A series of armed military ships escorted the convoy at various times during its journey.

Name	Flag	Type	Joined	Left
HMS Alisma	Royal Navy	Flower-class corvette	21 July 1941	26 July 1941
HMS Begonia	Royal Navy	Flower-class corvette	20 July 1941	28 July 1941
HMS Black Swan	Royal Navy	Black Swan-class sloop	19 July 1941	20 July 1941
HMS Dianella	Royal Navy	Flower-class corvette	21 July 1941	26 July 1941
HMT Drangey	Royal Navy	ASW (Anti-submarine warfare) trawler	20 July 1941	20 July 1941
HMS Fleur De Lys	Royal Navy	Flower-class corvette	27 July 1941	1 August 1941
HMS Goodwin	Royal Navy	Armed boarding vessel	19 July 1941	20 July 1941
HMS Jasmine	Royal Navy	Flower-class corvette	20 July 1941	1 August 1941
HMS Kingcup	Royal Navy	Flower-class corvette	21 July 1941	26 July 1941
HMT Lady Hogarth	Royal Navy	ASW trawler	27 July 1941	1 August 1941
HMT Lady Shirley	Royal Navy	ASW trawler	27 July 1941	31 July 1941
HMS Larkspur	Royal Navy	Flower-class corvette	20 July 1941	1 August 1941
HMT Paynter	Royal Navy	ASW trawler	19 July 1941	20 July 1941
HMS Pimpernel	Royal Navy	Flower-class corvette	20 July 1941	1 August 1941
HMS Rhododendron	Royal Navy	Flower-class corvette	20 July 1941	30 July 1941
HMT St Nectan	Royal Navy	ASW trawler	20 July 1941	1 August 1941
HMS Sunflower	Royal Navy	Flower-class corvette	21 July 1941	27 July 1941

== See also ==
- List of shipwrecks in July 1941

== Bibliography ==
- Hague, Arnold (2000). The Allied Convoy System 1939–1945. ISBN 1-86176-147-3.
- Rohwer, J.; Hummelchen, G. (1992). Chronology of the War at Sea 1939–1945. Naval Institute Press. ISBN 1-55750-105-X.
- Syrett, David (January 2003). "The Battle for Convoy OG 69, 20–29 July 1941". The Mariner's Mirror. 89 (1): 71–81. doi:10.1080/00253359.2003.10659275. ISSN 0025-3359.
