= German submarine U-79 (1941) =

German World War II submarine

History

Nazi Germany
- Name: U-79
- Ordered: 25 January 1939
- Builder: Bremer Vulkan-Vegesacker Werft, Bremen-Vegesack
- Yard number: 7
- Laid down: 17 April 1940
- Launched: 25 January 1941
- Commissioned: 13 March 1941
- Fate: Sunk on 23 December 1941

General characteristics
- Class & type: Type VIIC submarine
- Displacement: 769 tonnes (757 long tons) surfaced; 871 t (857 long tons) submerged
- Length: 67.10 m (220 ft 2 in) o/a; 50.50 m (165 ft 8 in) pressure hull
- Beam: 6.20 m (20 ft 4 in) o/a; 4.70 m (15 ft 5 in) pressure hull
- Height: 9.60 m (31 ft 6 in)
- Draught: 4.74 m (15 ft 7 in)
- Installed power: 2,800–3,200 PS (2,100–2,400 kW; 2,800–3,200 bhp) (diesels); 750 PS (550 kW; 740 shp) (electric)
- Propulsion: 2 shafts; 2 × diesel engines; 2 × electric motors
- Speed: 17.7 knots (32.8 km/h; 20.4 mph) surfaced; 7.6 knots (14.1 km/h; 8.7 mph) submerged
- Range: 8,500 nmi (15,700 km; 9,800 mi) at 10 knots (19 km/h; 12 mph) surfaced; 80 nmi (150 km; 92 mi) at 4 knots (7.4 km/h; 4.6 mph) submerged
- Test depth: 230 m (750 ft); Crush depth: 250–295 m (820–968 ft)
- Complement: 4 officers, 40–56 enlisted
- Armament: 5 × 53.3 cm (21 in) torpedo tubes (four bow, one stern); 14 × torpedoes or 26 TMA mines; 1 × 8.8 cm (3.46 in) deck gun (220 rounds); 1 x 2 cm (0.79 in) C/30 AA gun

Service record
- Part of: 1st U-boat Flotilla; 13 March – 30 September 1941; 23rd U-boat Flotilla; 1 October – 23 December 1941
- Identification codes: M 31 936
- Commanders: Kptlt. Wolfgang Kaufmann; 13 March – 23 December 1941
- Operations: 6 patrols: 1st patrol: 5 June – 5 July 1941; 2nd patrol: 21 July – 16 August 1941; 3rd patrol: 14 – 18 September 1941; 4th patrol: 28 September – 23 October 1941; 5th patrol: 29 November – 8 December 1941; 6th patrol: 21 – 23 December 1941
- Victories: 2 merchant ships sunk (2,983 GRT); 1 warship total loss (625 tons); 1 merchant ship damaged (10,356 GRT)

German submarine U-79 was a Type VIIC U-boat of the Kriegsmarine built by the Bremer Vulkan-Vegesacker Werft, Bremen-Vegesack. Her keel was laid down on 17 April 1940, by Bremer Vulkan of Bremen-Vegesack, Germany as yard number 7. She was launched on 25 January 1941 and commissioned on 13 March, with Kapitänleutnant Wolfgang Kaufmann in command until the U-boat's loss.

The boat was sunk on 23 December 1941 north of Sollum, by two British warships.

== Design ==
German Type VIIC submarines were preceded by the shorter Type VIIB submarines. U-79 had a displacement of 769 tonnes (757 long tons) when at the surface and 871 tonnes (857 long tons) while submerged. She had a total length of 67.10 m (220 ft 2 in), a pressure hull length of 50.50 m (165 ft 8 in), a beam of 6.20 m (20 ft 4 in), a height of 9.60 m (31 ft 6 in), and a draught of 4.74 m (15 ft 7 in). The submarine was powered by two MAN 6-cylinder 4-stroke M 6 V 40/46 four-stroke, six-cylinder supercharged diesel engines producing a total of 2,800 to 3,200 metric horsepower (2,060 to 2,350 kW; 2,760 to 3,160 shp) for use while surfaced, two Brown, Boveri & Cie GG UB 720/8 double-acting electric motors producing a total of 750 metric horsepower (550 kW; 740 shp) for use while submerged. She had two shafts and two 1.23 m (4 ft) propellers. The boat was capable of operating at depths of up to 230 metres (750 ft).

The submarine had a maximum surface speed of 17.7 knots (32.8 km/h; 20.4 mph) and a maximum submerged speed of 7.6 knots (14.1 km/h; 8.7 mph). When submerged, the boat could operate for 80 nautical miles (150 km; 92 mi) at 4 knots (7.4 km/h; 4.6 mph); when surfaced, she could travel 8,500 nautical miles (15,700 km; 9,800 mi) at 10 knots (19 km/h; 12 mph). U-79 was fitted with five 53.3 cm (21 in) torpedo tubes (four fitted at the bow and one at the stern), fourteen torpedoes, one 8.8 cm (3.46 in) SK C/35 naval gun, 220 rounds, and a 2 cm (0.79 in) C/30 anti-aircraft gun. The boat had a complement of between forty-four and sixty.

== Service history ==
U-79 conducted three patrols whilst serving with 1st U-boat Flotilla from 13 March 1941 to 30 September. She was then reassigned to the 23rd U-boat Flotilla from 1 October until she was sunk.

=== First patrol ===
The boat's first patrol began with her departure from Kiel on 5 June 1941. Her route took her north 'up' the North Sea and through the gap separating Iceland and the Faroe Islands toward the Atlantic Ocean.

She sank the Havtor west of Iceland on the 11th and damaged the Tibia at 59°55′N 39°00′W (southwest of the island), on the 27th.

U-79 then docked at the newly captured port of Lorient on the French Atlantic coast on 5 July.

=== Second and third patrols ===
The boat's second foray was further south than her first. She was with a group of seven other U-boats that attacked Convoy OG 69 and sank the British freighter Kellwyn about 350 nmi (650 km; 400 mi) northwest of Cape Finisterre in Spain on 27 July 1941.

She was unsuccessfully attacked with depth charges by convoy escorts near the Portuguese coast on 12 August.

U-79's third sortie hardly left the Bay of Biscay and only lasted five days (14–18 September 1941).

=== Fourth and fifth patrols ===
Patrol number four necessitated the boat getting past the heavily defended British base at Gibraltar to reach the Mediterranean Sea which she had by 5 October 1941. She then negotiated the Straits of Messina [between Sicily and the Italian mainland] and moved toward the North African coast. There she encountered the British gunboat HMS Gnat and sank her 30 nmi (56 km; 35 mi) northeast of Bardia (Al Burdi) on 21 October. She reached Salamis in Greece on 23 October 1941. However HMS Gnat was salved and returned to serve as a gun platform.

U-79 returned to the North African coast for her fifth patrol at the end of November but her luck had deserted her. She returned to Salamis with nothing to show for her efforts on 8 December.

=== Sixth patrol and loss ===
Leaving Salamis for the last time on 21 December 1941, she was sunk a couple of days later (on the 23rd), by depth charges dropped by the British destroyers HMS Hasty and Hotspur in position 32°15′N 25°19′E. All U-79's crewmembers (44 men) survived the attack.

=== Wolfpacks ===
U-79 took part in one wolfpack, namely:

- Goeben (28 September – 5 October 1941)

== Summary of raiding history ==
| Date | Ship | Nationality | Tonnage (Note: Merchant ship tonnages are in gross register tons. Military vessels are listed by tons displacement.) | Fate |
|---|---|---|---|---|
| 11 June 1941 | Havtor | Norway | 1,524 | Sunk |
| 27 June 1941 | Tibia | Netherlands | 10,356 | Damaged |
| 27 July 1941 | Kellwyn | United Kingdom | 1,459 | Sunk |
| 21 October 1941 | HMS Gnat | Royal Navy | 625 | Total loss |

== See also ==
- Mediterranean U-boat Campaign (World War II)

== Bibliography ==
- Bishop, Chris (2006). Kriegsmarine U-Boats, 1939-45. London: Amber Books. ISBN 978-1-904687-96-2.
- Busch, Rainer; Röll, Hans-Joachim (1999). German U-boat commanders of World War II : a biographical dictionary. Translated by Brooks, Geoffrey. London, Annapolis, Md: Greenhill Books, Naval Institute Press. ISBN 1-55750-186-6.
- Busch, Rainer; Röll, Hans-Joachim (1999). Der U-Boot-Krieg, 1939-1945: Deutsche U-Boot-Verluste von September 1939 bis Mai 1945 [German U-boat losses from September 1939 to May 1945] (in German). Vol. IV. Hamburg, Berlin, Bonn: Mittler. ISBN 3-8132-0514-2.
- Gröner, Eric; Jung, Dieter; Maass, Martin (1991). German Warships 1815-1945: U-boats and Mine Warfare Vessels. Vol. 2. Translated by Thomas, Keith; Magowan, Rachel. London: Conway Maritime Press. ISBN 0-85177-593-4.
- Kemp, Paul (1999). U-Boats Destroyed - German Submarine Losses in the World Wars. London: Arms & Armour. ISBN 1-85409-515-3.
