= SS City of Venice =

Passenger vessel from 1924 to 1943

Coordinates: 36°44′N 1°31′E

History

United Kingdom
- Name: City of Venice
- Namesake: Venice
- Owner: Ellerman Lines Ltd
- Operator: George Smith & Sons (until 1932); City Line Ltd (1933 onward)
- Port of registry: Glasgow
- Builder: Workman, Clark and Company, Belfast
- Yard number: 468
- Launched: 6 February 1924
- Completed: April 1924
- Identification: UK official number 147890; code letters KQJM (until 1933); call sign GKCQ (1934 onward)
- Fate: Sunk by torpedo 4 July 1943

General characteristics
- Type: Ocean liner
- Tonnage: until 1932: 8,308 GRT; 5,233 NRT; 1933 onward: 8,311 GRT; 5,225 NRT
- Length: 455.2 ft (138.7 m)
- Beam: 58.1 ft (17.7 m)
- Draught: 34 ft 0 in (10.36 m)
- Depth: 31.3 ft (9.5 m)
- Decks: 2
- Installed power: as built: 819 NHP; 1933 onward: 972 NHP
- Propulsion: as built: quadruple-expansion engine; added 1933: exhaust turbine with electric transmission
- Speed: 13.5 knots (25.0 km/h)
- Crew: 158
- Sensors & processing systems: wireless direction finding (by 1933); echo sounding device (by 1934)
- Armament: (as DEMS): 1 × 4-inch gun; 1 × QF 12-pounder gun; 8 × Oerlikon 20 mm cannon

SS City of Venice was an intermediate ocean liner that was launched in 1924 in Northern Ireland for Ellerman Lines. In the Second World War she was a troop ship. In 1943 a U-boat sank her in the Mediterranean, killing 22 of the crew and troops aboard.

She was one of at least three successive ships of the Ellermans Lines to be called City of Venice. There was a sailing ship that was built in 1867 and wrecked in 1871, and a steamship that was built in 1875 and scrapped in 1912.

== Details ==
Workman, Clark and Company built City of Venice in Belfast, launching her on 6 February 1924 and completing her that April. She was 455.2 ft (138.7 m) long, had a beam of 58.1 ft (17.7 m) and a draught of 34 ft 0 in (10.36 m). As built, she had a quadruple-expansion steam engine that was rated at 819 NHP.

In 1933 Ellerman Lines had a steam turbine with electric transmission added. Exhaust steam from the low-pressure cylinder of her piston engine drove the turbine. The turbine drove an electric generator, which powered an electric motor that drove the same shaft as her piston engine.

The addition of the turbine increased City of Venice's fuel efficiency. It also increased her total installed power to 972 NHP, which was a 19 per cent increase and gave her a speed of 13.5 knots (25.0 km/h).

City of Venice was equipped with wireless direction finding from about 1933 and an echo sounding device from about 1934.

== Wartime service ==
In the Second World War City of Venice carried troops and supplies between the UK, Africa, India and Egypt. In 1941 she paid one visit to Halifax, Nova Scotia, from where she sailed to Liverpool in Convoy HX 146. She sailed mostly unescorted, with only occasional convoy protection. After the Allied invasion of French North Africa she sailed between the Clyde and the Mediterranean, starting with Convoy KMS 3G that left the Clyde on 8 November and reached Philippeville in French Algeria on 26 November.

=== Loss ===
Her final voyage was in support of Operation Husky, the Allied invasion of Sicily. City of Venice was carrying 292 infantry of the 1st Canadian Division, ten naval personnel, and 700 tons of military equipment including the landing craft HMS LCE-14. She was in Convoy KMS 18B, which left the Clyde on 24 June 1943.

At 2047 hours on 4 July, KMS 18B was off the Algerian coast about 10 miles north of Cape Ténès, and City of Venice was steering a zigzag course at 7 knots (13 km/h), when U-409 fired one torpedo at her starboard side. The torpedo blew a hole in her number two hold and destroyed one of her lifeboats. In the hold were military vehicles whose fuel caught fire, and the explosion disabled the ship's auxiliary pump and deck water service pipes. Water started to get into number three hold as well, and the ship started to settle by the head.

City of Venice's Master, James Wyper, gave the order to abandon ship with six of the lifeboats, keeping back boat number eight alongside the ship for himself and a skeleton crew. Boat number six was launched too quickly and swamped, and as a result two lascar crewmen drowned. 19 rafts and two floats were also launched, and by 2130 hrs everyone had left the ship except the skeleton crew of 25–30 men. They fought the fire with the hope of controlling it and then beaching the ship on the coast.

=== Rescue ===
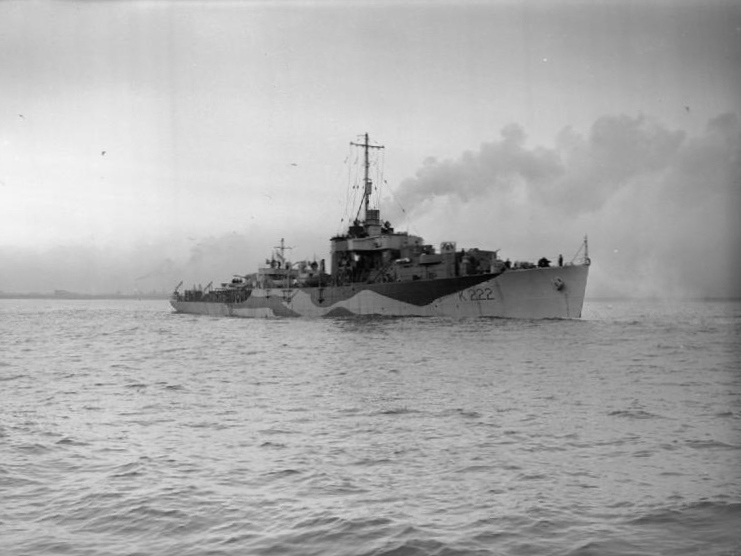
The frigate HMS Teviot, which rescued 204 of City of Venice's survivors

At about 2200 hrs boat number eight went to rescue survivors in the water. The fire now threatened to ignite the ship's forward magazine and some petrol that she was carrying as deck cargo, so the River-class frigate HMS Teviot came alongside the ship and took off the remainder of the skeleton crew.

Boat number eight, carrying about 60 people, then came alongside Teviot's starboard quarter, but became fouled, capsized and threw all its occupants into the sea. Captain Wyper, eight crew, one DEMS gunner, nine Canadian troops and their commanding officer were killed.

Teviot rescued 204 of the survivors. The Flower-class corvette HMS Rhododendron and rescue tug Restive rescued the remainder. The survivors were landed at Algiers on 5 July. City of Venice sank at 0530 hrs that morning, burning fore and aft.

Until relatively recently U-375 was widely believed to have sunk City of Venice. Newer research shows this is inconsistent with the time of the sinking, and U-409 must have been responsible. U-409 was sunk a week later, with the loss of 11 of her 48 crew.
