= German submarine U-203 =

German World War II submarine

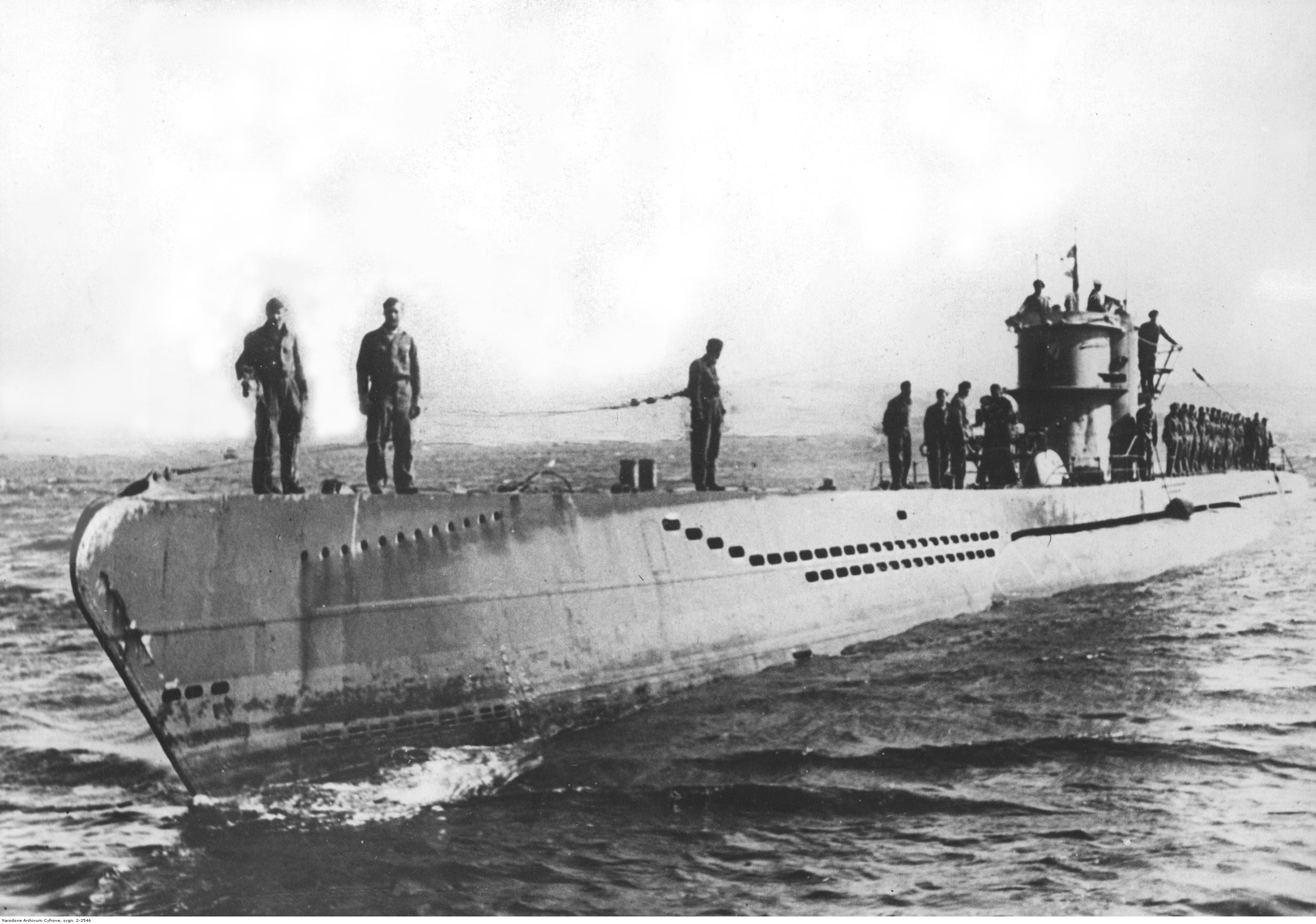

History

Nazi Germany
- Name: U-203
- Ordered: 23 September 1939
- Builder: Germaniawerft, Kiel
- Yard number: 632
- Laid down: 28 March 1940
- Launched: 4 January 1941
- Commissioned: 18 February 1941
- Fate: Sunk, 25 April 1943

General characteristics
- Class & type: Type VIIC U-boat
- Displacement: 769 tonnes (757 long tons) surfaced; 871 t (857 long tons) submerged
- Length: 67.10 m (220.1 ft) o/a; 50.50 m (165.7 ft) pressure hull
- Beam: 6.20 m (20.3 ft) o/a; 4.70 m (15.4 ft) pressure hull
- Draught: 4.74 m (15.6 ft)
- Installed power: 2,800–3,200 PS (2,100–2,400 kW; 2,800–3,200 bhp) (diesels); 750 PS (550 kW; 740 shp) (electric)
- Propulsion: 2 shafts; 2 × diesel engines; 2 × electric motors
- Speed: 17.7 knots (32.8 km/h; 20.4 mph) surfaced; 7.6 knots (14.1 km/h; 8.7 mph) submerged
- Range: 8,500 nmi (15,700 km; 9,800 mi) at 10 knots (19 km/h; 12 mph) surfaced; 80 nmi (150 km; 92 mi) at 4 knots (7.4 km/h; 4.6 mph) submerged
- Test depth: Calculated crush depth: 220 m (720 ft)
- Complement: 4 officers, 40–56 enlisted
- Armament: 4 × 53.3 cm (21 in) torpedo tubes (bow); 11 torpedoes or 26 TMA mines; 1 × 8.8 cm (3.5 in) deck gun with 220 rounds; various anti-aircraft guns

Service record
- Part of: 1st U-boat Flotilla; 18 February 1941 – 25 April 1943
- Identification codes: M 36 449
- Commanders: Kptlt. Rolf Mützelburg; 18 February 1941 – 11 September 1942; Oblt.z.S. Hans Seidel; 11 – 20 September 1942; Oblt.z.S. / Kptlt. Hermann Kottmann; 21 September 1942 – 25 April 1943
- Operations: 11 patrols: 1st patrol: 5 – 29 June 1941; 2nd patrol: 10 – 31 July 1941; 3rd patrol: 20 – 30 September 1941; 4th patrol: 18 October – 12 November 1941; 5th patrol: 25 December 1941 – 29 January 1942; 6th patrol: a. 12 March – 30 April 1942; b. 3 – 4 June 1942; 7th patrol: 4 June – 29 July 1942; 8th patrol: a. 27 August – 11 September 1942; b. 11 – 18 September 1942; 9th patrol: 15 October – 6 November 1942; 10th patrol: 6 December 1942 – 7 January 1943; 11th patrol: 3 – 25 April 1943
- Victories: 19 merchant ships sunk (91,577 GRT); 3 merchant ships damaged (17,052 GRT)

German submarine U-203 was a German Type VIIC submarine U-boat built for Nazi Germany's Kriegsmarine for service during World War II.

Built as yard number 632 of Friedrich Krupp Germaniawerft AG in Kiel, she was laid down on 28 March 1940, launched on 4 January 1941 and commissioned on 18 February under Kapitänleutnant Rolf Mützelburg.

U-203 carried out eleven patrols with the first flotilla and is credited with sinking 19 ships for 91,577 gross register tons (GRT) and damaging a further three for 17,052 GRT. She was a member of eleven wolfpacks.

She was sunk by British carrier-borne aircraft and a British warship southeast of Greenland on 25 April 1943.

== Design ==
German Type VIIC submarines were preceded by the shorter Type VIIB submarines. U-203 had a displacement of 769 tonnes (757 long tons) when at the surface and 871 tonnes (857 long tons) while submerged. She had a total length of 67.10 m (220 ft 2 in), a pressure hull length of 50.50 m (165 ft 8 in), a beam of 6.20 m (20 ft 4 in), a height of 9.60 m (31 ft 6 in), and a draught of 4.74 m (15 ft 7 in). The submarine was powered by two Germaniawerft F46 four-stroke, six-cylinder supercharged diesel engines producing a total of 2,800 to 3,200 metric horsepower (2,060 to 2,350 kW; 2,760 to 3,160 shp) for use while surfaced, two AEG GU 460/8–27 double-acting electric motors producing a total of 750 metric horsepower (550 kW; 740 shp) for use while submerged. She had two shafts and two 1.23 m (4 ft) propellers. The boat was capable of operating at depths of up to 230 metres (750 ft).

The submarine had a maximum surface speed of 17.7 knots (32.8 km/h; 20.4 mph) and a maximum submerged speed of 7.6 knots (14.1 km/h; 8.7 mph). When submerged, the boat could operate for 80 nautical miles (150 km; 92 mi) at 4 knots (7.4 km/h; 4.6 mph); when surfaced, she could travel 8,500 nautical miles (15,700 km; 9,800 mi) at 10 knots (19 km/h; 12 mph). U-203 was fitted with four bow 53.3 cm (21 in) torpedo tubes, eleven torpedoes, one 8.8 cm (3.46 in) SK C/35 naval gun, 220 rounds, and a 2 cm (0.79 in) C/30 anti-aircraft gun. The boat had a complement of between forty-four and sixty. U-203 was one of the few Type VIIC U-boats which did not have a stern torpedo tube.

== Service history ==
=== First, second and third patrols ===
On 24 June 1941, nineteen days into her first patrol while en route from Kiel to St. Nazaire in France, U-203 attacked and sank the GRT 4,956 GRT British merchant ship Kinross, which was part of Convoy OB 336. Later that day, she attacked the 4,402 GRT Norwegian ship Soløy, which was with Convoy HX 133.

Arriving at St. Nazaire on 29 June, the crew of U-203 stayed ashore for another eleven days before the boat made her second patrol. Seventeen days into it, she attacked Convoy OG 69 which was sailing to Gibraltar. On the 27th, U-203 sank the 2,475 GRT British merchant ship Hawkinge. The British Lapland and the Swedish Norita, also OG 69 merchant ships, were sunk the following day, adding a further 1,330 GRT and 1,516 GRT respectively to the U-boat's record.

Six days into her third patrol she joined a wolfpack attack on Convoy HG 73 On 26 September she sank the British ships Avoceta and the Norwegian Varanberg, destroying another 7,362 GRT of shipping. Avoceta's sinking killed 123 people. The Convoy Commodore was aboard, but was one of the few dozen survivors.

=== Fourth, fifth and sixth patrols ===
Sixteen days into her fourth patrol, on 3 November, U-203 attacked and sank Empire Gemsbuck (5,626 GRT) and Everoja (4,830 GRT), British merchant ships of Convoy SC 52. Everoja was Latvian owned and carried an Irish cargo. However, she transferred to the British registry and sailed under the Red Ensign.

Twenty-one days into her fifth patrol on 15 January 1942, U-203 sank a small (632 GRT) Portuguese ship, Catalina. Four torpedoes were fired at the Canadian ship North Gaspe, which survived the attack. One torpedo detonated close to the ship, but none actually hit.

U-203's sixth patrol resulted in a total loss of 14,232 GRT to the Allies and two additional ships damaged, including the British merchant ships San Delfino and Empire Thrush. Damaged were the American tanker Henry F. Sinclair, Jr. and the Panamanian flagged tanker Stanvac Melbourne.

=== Seventh, eighth and ninth patrols ===
A seventh patrol beginning 4 June 1942, resulted in 32,985 GRT of shipping destroyed. The Brazilian Pedrinhas and the British Putney Hill were sunk on 26 June. Two days later the American Liberty Ship Sam Houston was torpedoed and then finished off with 43 rounds from the deck gun. The British Cape Verde was sunk on 9 July and the Panamanian tanker Stanvac Palembang on 11 July bringing the tally to five victories on this successful patrol.

The next 23-day sortie was unfruitful; however, the U-boat's commander, Rolf Mützelburg, died during this patrol on 11 September. Taking the opportunity to go swimming in the Atlantic southwest of the Azores, he dived from the conning tower and struck the deck with his head and shoulder when the U-boat lurched suddenly in the swell. The doctor from U-462, a 'Milk Cow' supply submarine, arrived the next day, but too late. Rolf Mützelburg was buried at sea on 12 September 1942 in position 36°14′N 31°21′W. He was replaced by Kptlt. Hermann Kottman, who served as captain for the remainder of U-203's career.

Her ninth patrol, beginning 15 October 1942 and terminating 6 November, yielded two further ships sunk. The British cargo ships Hopecastle and Corinaldo (5,178 and 7,131 GRT, respectively) were sunk on 29 October and 30 October while travelling with Convoy SL-125.

== Loss ==
U-203 undertook two more patrols, both unsuccessful. On 25 April 1943 while south of Cape Farewell, Greenland she was sunk by depth charges in position 55°05′N 42°25′W. She had been attacked by Fairey Swordfish aircraft operating from the British escort carrier HMS Biter and the British destroyer HMS Pathfinder. Ten men were killed, there were 38 survivors.

=== Wolfpacks ===
U-203 took part in eleven wolfpacks, namely:

- Schlagetot (20 October – 1 November 1941)
- Raubritter (1 – 5 November 1941)
- Seydlitz (27 December 1941 – 7 January 1942)
- Zieten (7 – 22 January 1942)
- Iltis (6 – 10 September 1942)
- Streitaxt (20 – 30 October 1942)
- Raufbold (11 – 22 December 1942)
- Spitz (22 – 31 December 1942)
- Lerche (10 – 16 April 1943)
- Meise (16 – 22 April 1943)
- Specht (23 – 25 April 1943)

== Summary of raiding history ==
U-203 sank 21 ships and damaged three others for a total of 111,322 GRT.

Date	Ship	Nationality	Tonnage (GRT)	Convoy	Fate
24 June 1941	Kinross	United Kingdom	4,956	OB 336	Sunk
24 June 1941	Soløy	Norway	4,402	HX 133	Sunk
27 July 1941	Hawkinge	United Kingdom	2,475	OG 69	Sunk
28 July 1941	Lapland	United Kingdom	1,330	OG 69	Sunk
28 July 1941	Norita	Sweden	1,516	OG 69	Sunk
26 September 1941	Avoceta	United Kingdom	3,442	HG 73	Sunk
26 September 1941	Varangberg	Norway	2,842	HG 73	Sunk
3 November 1941	Empire Gemsbuck	United Kingdom	5,626	SC 52	Sunk
3 November 1941	Everoja	United Kingdom	4,830	SC 52	Sunk
15 January 1942	Catalina	Portugal	632		Sunk
21 January 1942	North Gaspe	Canada	888		Damaged
10 April 1942	San Delfino	United Kingdom	8,072		Sunk
11 April 1942	Harry F. Sinclair, Jr.	United States	6,151		Damaged
12 April 1942	Stanvac Melbourne	Panama	10,013		Damaged
14 April 1942	Empire Thrush	United Kingdom	6,160		Sunk
26 June 1942	Pedrinhas	Brazil	3,666		Sunk
26 June 1942	Putney Hill	United Kingdom	5,216		Sunk
28 June 1942	Sam Houston	United States	7,176		Sunk
9 July 1942	Cape Verde	United Kingdom	6,914		Sunk
11 July 1942	Stanvac Palembang	Panama	10,013		Sunk
29 October 1942	Hopecastle	United Kingdom	5,178	SL-125	Sunk
30 October 1942	Corinaldo	United Kingdom	7,131	SL-125	Sunk

== Patrol log ==
Patrol	Departure	Date	Return	Date	Duration (Days)
1st	Kiel	5 June 1941	St Nazaire	29 June 1941	25
2nd	St Nazaire	10 July 1941	St Nazaire	31 July 1941	22
3rd	St Nazaire	20 September 1941	Brest	30 September 1941	11
4th	Brest	18 October 1941	Brest	12 November 1941	26
5th	Brest	25 December 1941	Brest	29 January 1942	36
6th	Brest	12 March 1942	Brest	30 April 1942	50
7th	Lorient	4 June 1942	Brest	29 July 1942	56
8th	Brest	27 August 1942	Brest	18 September 1942	24
9th	Brest	15 October 1942	Lorient	6 November 1942	23
10th	Lorient	6 December 1942	Brest	7 January 1943	33
11th	Brest	3 April 1943	Sunk	25 April 1943	23

== Bibliography ==
- Busch, Rainer; Röll, Hans-Joachim (1999). German U-boat commanders of World War II : a biographical dictionary. Translated by Brooks, Geoffrey. London, Annapolis, MD: Greenhill Books, Naval Institute Press. ISBN 1-55750-186-6.
- Busch, Rainer; Röll, Hans-Joachim (1999). Deutsche U-Boot-Verluste von September 1939 bis Mai 1945 [German U-boat losses from September 1939 to May 1945]. Der U-Boot-Krieg (in German). Vol. IV. Hamburg, Berlin, Bonn: Mittler. ISBN 3-8132-0514-2.
- Edwards, Bernard (1996). Dönitz and the Wolf Packs - The U-boats at War. Cassell. pp. 117, 123, 137. ISBN 0-304-35203-9.
- Gröner, Erich; Jung, Dieter; Maass, Martin (1991). U-boats and Mine Warfare Vessels. German Warships 1815–1945. Vol. 2. Translated by Thomas, Keith; Magowan, Rachel. London: Conway Maritime Press. ISBN 0-85177-593-4.
- Showell, Jak P. Mallmann (2006). The U-boat Century: German Submarine Warfare 1906-2006. London: Chatham Publishing. ISBN 9781861762412.
