= German submarine U-572 =

German World War II submarine

History

Nazi Germany
- Name: U-572
- Ordered: 24 October 1939
- Builder: Blohm & Voss of Hamburg
- Yard number: 548
- Laid down: 15 June 1940
- Launched: 5 April 1941
- Commissioned: 29 May 1941
- Fate: Sunk on 3 August 1943 off Trinidad

General characteristics
- Class & type: Type VIIC submarine
- Displacement: 769 tonnes (757 long tons) surfaced; 871 t (857 long tons) submerged
- Length: 67.10 m (220 ft 2 in) o/a; 50.50 m (165 ft 8 in) pressure hull
- Beam: 6.20 m (20 ft 4 in) o/a; 4.70 m (15 ft 5 in) pressure hull
- Height: 9.60 m (31 ft 6 in)
- Draught: 4.74 m (15 ft 7 in)
- Installed power: 2,800–3,200 PS (2,100–2,400 kW; 2,800–3,200 bhp) (diesels); 750 PS (550 kW; 740 shp) (electric)
- Propulsion: 2 shafts; 2 × diesel engines; 2 × electric motors
- Speed: 17.7 knots (32.8 km/h; 20.4 mph) surfaced; 7.6 knots (14.1 km/h; 8.7 mph) submerged
- Range: 8,500 nmi (15,700 km; 9,800 mi) at 10 knots (19 km/h; 12 mph) surfaced; 80 nmi (150 km; 92 mi) at 4 knots (7.4 km/h; 4.6 mph) submerged
- Test depth: 230 m (750 ft); Crush depth: 250–295 m (820–968 ft)
- Complement: 4 officers, 40–56 enlisted
- Armament: 5 × 53.3 cm (21 in) torpedo tubes (four bow, one stern); 14 × torpedoes or 26 TMA mines; 1 × 8.8 cm (3.46 in) deck gun (220 rounds); 1 x 2 cm (0.79 in) C/30 AA gun

Service record
- Part of: 3rd U-boat Flotilla; 29 May 1941 – 3 August 1943
- Identification codes: M 42 493
- Commanders: Kptlt. Heinz Hirsacker; 29 May 1941 – 18 December 1942; Oblt.z.S. Heinz Kummetat; 18 December 1942 – 3 August 1943
- Operations: 9 patrols: 1st patrol: 2 September – 2 October 1941; 2nd patrol: 30 October – 29 November 1941; 3rd patrol: 7 January – 10 February 1942; 4th patrol: 14 March – 14 May 1942; 5th patrol: 30 June – 3 September 1942; 6th patrol: 12 October – 22 November 1942; 7th patrol: 23 December 1942 – 11 February 1943; 8th patrol: 10 March – 18 April 1943; 9th patrol: 2 June – 3 August 1943
- Victories: 6 merchant ships sunk (19,323 GRT); 1 merchant ship damaged (6,207 GRT)

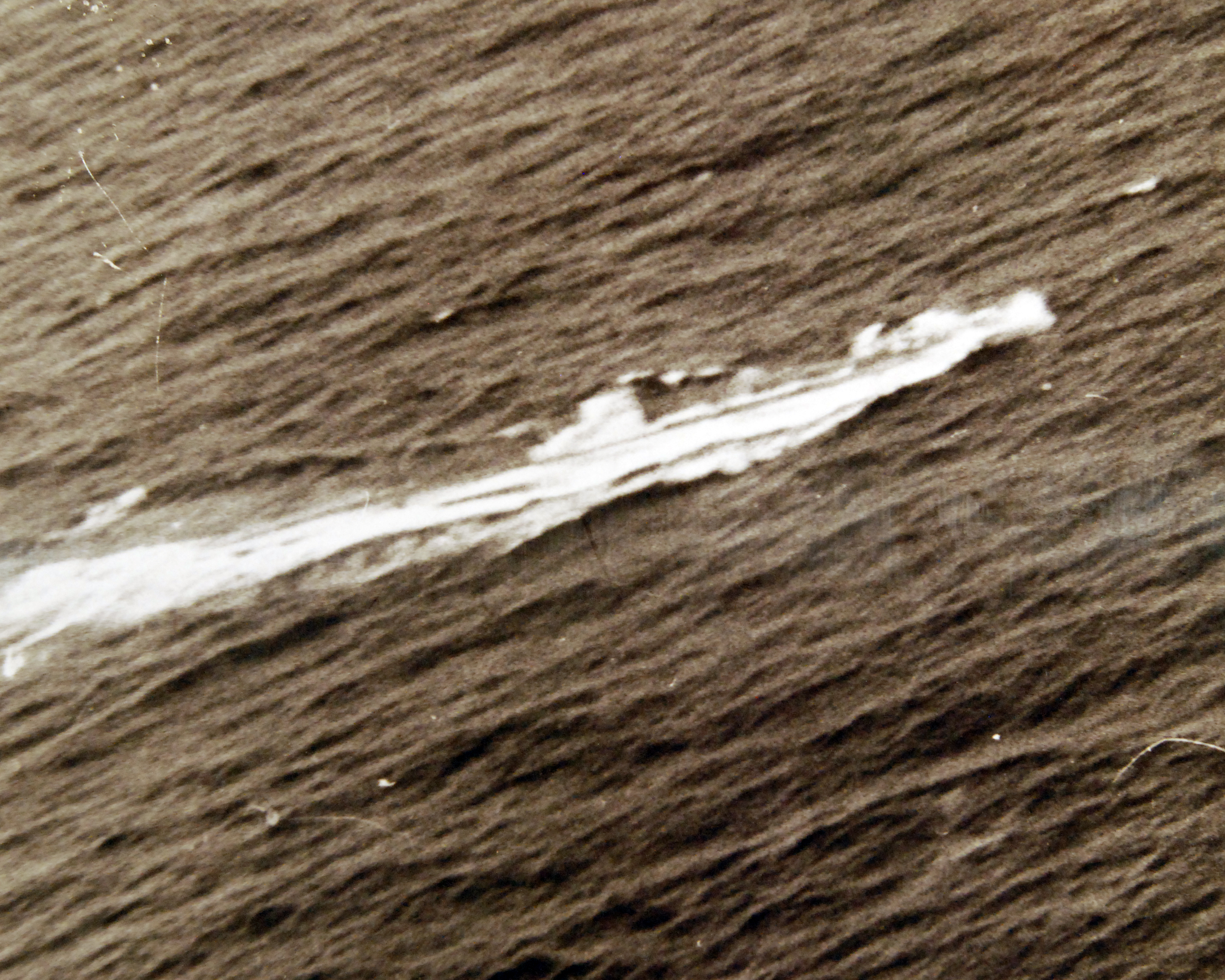
Aerial image of U-572, U.S. Navy, August 3, 1943

German submarine U-572 was a Type VIIC U-boat built for Nazi Germany's Kriegsmarine for service during World War II. Her keel was laid down 15 June 1940 at the Blohm & Voss yard in Hamburg as yard number 548. She was launched on 5 April 1941 and commissioned on 29 May.

== Design ==
German Type VIIC submarines were preceded by the shorter Type VIIB submarines. U-572 had a displacement of 769 tonnes (757 long tons) when at the surface and 871 tonnes (857 long tons) while submerged. She had a total length of 67.10 m (220 ft 2 in), a pressure hull length of 50.50 m (165 ft 8 in), a beam of 6.20 m (20 ft 4 in), a height of 9.60 m (31 ft 6 in), and a draught of 4.74 m (15 ft 7 in). The submarine was powered by two Germaniawerft F46 four-stroke, six-cylinder supercharged diesel engines producing a total of 2,800 to 3,200 metric horsepower (2,060 to 2,350 kW; 2,760 to 3,160 shp) for use while surfaced, two BBC GG UB 720/8 double-acting electric motors producing a total of 750 metric horsepower (550 kW; 740 shp) for use while submerged. She had two shafts and two 1.23 m (4 ft) propellers. The boat was capable of operating at depths of up to 230 metres (750 ft).

The submarine had a maximum surface speed of 17.7 knots (32.8 km/h; 20.4 mph) and a maximum submerged speed of 7.6 knots (14.1 km/h; 8.7 mph). When submerged, the boat could operate for 80 nautical miles (150 km; 92 mi) at 4 knots (7.4 km/h; 4.6 mph); when surfaced, she could travel 8,500 nautical miles (15,700 km; 9,800 mi) at 10 knots (19 km/h; 12 mph). U-572 was fitted with five 53.3 cm (21 in) torpedo tubes (four fitted at the bow and one at the stern), fourteen torpedoes, one 8.8 cm (3.46 in) SK C/35 naval gun, 220 rounds, and a 2 cm (0.79 in) C/30 anti-aircraft gun. The boat had a complement of between forty-four and sixty.

== Service history ==
U-572 undertook nine patrols before it was sunk by an Allied marine aircraft in the Mid Atlantic in 1943.

The boat made an attempt to enter the Mediterranean but the commander gave up after a long period submerged in the heavy defences at Gibraltar and stated that he considered that his boat had been damaged and therefore he could not continue. However, Kapitänleutnant Heinz Hirsacker was reported by his senior watch officer for alleged cowardice. He was found guilty of "cowardice in the presence of the enemy" by court-martial. On 24 April 1943 he committed suicide shortly before his execution. The U-boat was depth charged and sunk by a US Martin PBM Mariner from VP-205 NE of Trinidad on 3 August 1943, in position 11°35′N 54°05′W. All 47 crew members died.

=== Wolfpacks ===
U-572 took part in eleven wolfpacks, namely:

- Brandenburg (15 September – 1 October 1941)
- Störtebecker (5 – 19 November 1941)
- Gödecke (19 – 26 November 1941)
- Hai (3 – 21 July 1942)
- Streitaxt (20 October – 2 November 1942)
- Schlagetot (9 – 16 November 1942)
- Falke (28 December 1942 – 19 January 1943)
- Landsknecht (19 – 28 January 1943)
- Hartherz (3 – 7 February 1943)
- Seeteufel (21 – 30 March 1943)
- Löwenherz (1 – 10 April 1943)

== Summary of raiding history ==
Date	Ship Name	Nationality	Tonnage (Note: Merchant ship tonnages are in gross register tons. Military vessels are listed by tons displacement.)	Fate
4 April 1942	Ensis	United Kingdom	6,207	Damaged
16 April 1942	Desert Light	Panama	2,368	Sunk
20 April 1942	Empire Dryden	United Kingdom	7,164	Sunk
7 August 1942	Delfshaven	Netherlands	5,281	Sunk
22 June 1943	Lot	Free French Naval Forces	4,220	Sunk
14 July 1943	Harvard	United Kingdom	114	Sunk
15 July 1943	Gilbert B. Walters	United Kingdom	176	Sunk

== Bibliography ==
- Busch, Rainer; Röll, Hans-Joachim (1999). German U-boat commanders of World War II : a biographical dictionary. Translated by Brooks, Geoffrey. London, Annapolis, Md: Greenhill Books, Naval Institute Press. ISBN 1-55750-186-6.
- Busch, Rainer; Röll, Hans-Joachim (1999). Der U-Boot-Krieg, 1939-1945: Deutsche U-Boot-Verluste von September 1939 bis Mai 1945 [German U-boat losses from September 1939 to May 1945] (in German). Vol. IV. Hamburg, Berlin, Bonn: Mittler. ISBN 3-8132-0514-2.
- Gröner, Eric; Jung, Dieter; Maass, Martin (1991). German Warships 1815-1945: U-boats and Mine Warfare Vessels. Vol. 2. Translated by Thomas, Keith; Magowan, Rachel. London: Conway Maritime Press. ISBN 0-85177-593-4.
- Sharpe, Peter (1998). U-Boat Fact File. Earl Shilton: Midland Counties. ISBN 1-85780-072-9.
