= German submarine U-409 =

German World War II submarine

History

Nazi Germany
- Name: U-409
- Ordered: 30 October 1939
- Builder: Danziger Werft, Danzig
- Yard number: 110
- Laid down: 26 October 1940
- Launched: 23 September 1941
- Commissioned: 21 January 1942
- Fate: Sunk on 12 July 1943

General characteristics
- Class & type: Type VIIC submarine
- Displacement: 769 tonnes (757 long tons) surfaced; 871 t (857 long tons) submerged
- Length: 67.10 m (220 ft 2 in) o/a; 50.50 m (165 ft 8 in) pressure hull
- Beam: 6.20 m (20 ft 4 in) o/a; 4.70 m (15 ft 5 in) pressure hull
- Draught: 4.74 m (15 ft 7 in)
- Installed power: 2,800–3,200 PS (2,100–2,400 kW; 2,800–3,200 bhp) (diesels); 750 PS (550 kW; 740 shp) (electric)
- Propulsion: 2 shafts; 2 × diesel engines; 2 × electric motors
- Speed: 17.7 knots (32.8 km/h; 20.4 mph) surfaced; 7.6 knots (14.1 km/h; 8.7 mph) submerged
- Range: 8,500 nmi (15,700 km; 9,800 mi) at 10 knots (19 km/h; 12 mph) surfaced; 80 nmi (150 km; 92 mi) at 4 knots (7.4 km/h; 4.6 mph) submerged
- Test depth: 230 m (750 ft); Crush depth: 250–295 m (820–968 ft)
- Complement: 4 officers, 40–56 enlisted
- Armament: 5 × 53.3 cm (21 in) torpedo tubes (4 bow, 1 stern); 14 × torpedoes; 1 × 8.8 cm (3.46 in) deck gun (220 rounds); 1 x 2 cm (0.79 in) C/30 AA gun

Service record
- Part of: 5th U-boat Flotilla; 21 January – 31 August 1942; 9th U-boat Flotilla; 1 September 1942 – 30 June 1943; 29th U-boat Flotilla; 1 – 12 July 1943
- Identification codes: M 24 443
- Commanders: Oblt.z.S. Hanns-Ferdinand Massmann; 21 January 1942 – 12 July 1943
- Operations: 6 patrols: 1st patrol: 18 August – 9 September 1942; 2nd patrol: 13 October – 5 November 1942; 3rd patrol: 7 December 1942 – 5 January 1943; 4th patrol: 14 February – 12 April 1943; 5th patrol: a. 18 – 21 May 1943; b. 26 May – 11 June 1943; 6th patrol: 29 June – 12 July 1943
- Victories: 4 merchant ships sunk (24,961 GRT); 1 warship sunk (10 tons); 1 merchant ship damaged (7,519 GRT)

German submarine U-409 was a Type VIIC U-boat of Nazi Germany's Kriegsmarine in World War II. She was laid down on 26 October 1940 by Danziger Werft, Danzig as yard number 110, launched on 23 September 1941 and commissioned on 21 January 1942 under Oberleutnant zur See Hanns-Ferdinand Massmann.

== Design ==
German Type VIIC submarines were preceded by the shorter Type VIIB submarines. U-409 had a displacement of 769 tonnes (757 long tons) when at the surface and 871 tonnes (857 long tons) while submerged. She had a total length of 67.10 m (220 ft 2 in), a pressure hull length of 50.50 m (165 ft 8 in), a beam of 6.20 m (20 ft 4 in), a height of 9.60 m (31 ft 6 in), and a draught of 4.74 m (15 ft 7 in). The submarine was powered by two Germaniawerft F46 four-stroke, six-cylinder supercharged diesel engines producing a total of 2,800 to 3,200 metric horsepower (2,060 to 2,350 kW; 2,760 to 3,160 shp) for use while surfaced, two Siemens-Schuckert GU 343/38–8 double-acting electric motors producing a total of 750 metric horsepower (550 kW; 740 shp) for use while submerged. She had two shafts and two 1.23 m (4 ft) propellers. The boat was capable of operating at depths of up to 230 metres (750 ft).

The submarine had a maximum surface speed of 17.7 knots (32.8 km/h; 20.4 mph) and a maximum submerged speed of 7.6 knots (14.1 km/h; 8.7 mph). When submerged, the boat could operate for 80 nautical miles (150 km; 92 mi) at 4 knots (7.4 km/h; 4.6 mph); when surfaced, she could travel 8,500 nautical miles (15,700 km; 9,800 mi) at 10 knots (19 km/h; 12 mph). U-409 was fitted with five 53.3 cm (21 in) torpedo tubes (four fitted at the bow and one at the stern), fourteen torpedoes, one 8.8 cm (3.46 in) SK C/35 naval gun, 220 rounds, and a 2 cm (0.79 in) C/30 anti-aircraft gun. The boat had a complement of between forty-four and sixty.

== Service history ==
The boat's career began with training at 5th U-boat Flotilla on 21 January 1942, followed by active service on 1 September 1942 as part of the 9th Flotilla. The following year, she transferred to 29th Flotilla for operations in the Mediterranean.

In six patrols she sank four merchant ships, for a total of 24,961 gross register tons (GRT), 1 merchant ship damaged 7,519 GRT, and one warship sunk whilst being transported.

=== Wolfpacks ===
U-409 took part in six wolfpacks, namely:

- Vorwärts (25 August – 2 September 1942)
- Streitaxt (20 October – 1 November 1942)
- Raufbold (11 – 18 December 1942)
- Sturmbock (21 – 26 February 1943)
- Wildfang (26 February – 5 March 1943)
- Westmark (6 – 11 March 1943)

=== Fate ===
U-409 was sunk on 12 July 1943 in the Mediterranean NE of Algiers, in position 37°12′N 04°00′E, by depth charges from the Royal Navy destroyer HMS Inconstant.

== Summary of raiding history ==
Date	Ship Name	Nationality	Tonnage (Note: Merchant ship tonnages are in gross register tons. Military vessels are listed by tons displacement.)	Fate
30 October 1942	Bullmouth	United Kingdom	7,519	Damaged
30 October 1942	Silverwillow	United Kingdom	6,373	Sunk
9 March 1943	Malantic	United States	3,837	Sunk
9 March 1943	Rosewood	United Kingdom	5,989	Sunk
4 July 1943	City of Venice	United Kingdom	8,762	Sunk
4 July 1943	HMS LCE-14 (Note: Being carried aboard City of Venice)	Royal Navy	10	Sunk

== See also ==
- Mediterranean U-boat Campaign (World War II)

== Bibliography ==
- Busch, Rainer; Röll, Hans-Joachim (1999). German U-boat commanders of World War II : a biographical dictionary. Translated by Brooks, Geoffrey. London, Annapolis, Md: Greenhill Books, Naval Institute Press. ISBN 1-55750-186-6.
- Edwards, Bernard (1996). Dönitz and the Wolf Packs - The U-boats at War. Cassell. pp. 117, 123, 171. ISBN 0-304-35203-9.
- Gröner, Erich; Jung, Dieter; Maass, Martin (1991). U-boats and Mine Warfare Vessels. German Warships 1815–1945. Vol. 2. Translated by Thomas, Keith; Magowan, Rachel. London: Conway Maritime Press. ISBN 0-85177-593-4.
- Sharpe, Peter (1998). U-Boat Fact File. Great Britain: Midland Publishing. ISBN 1-85780-072-9.
