= HMS Teviot (K222) =

River-class frigate of the Royal Navy

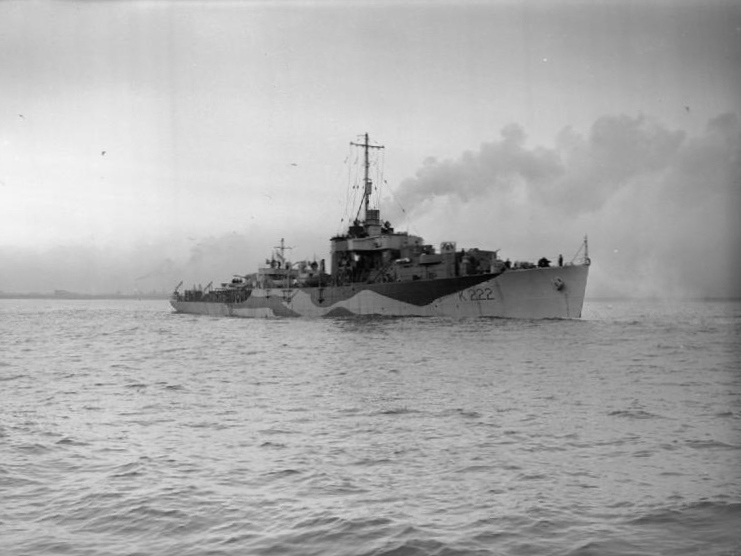
- HMS Teviot in April 1943

History

United Kingdom
- Name: Teviot
- Namesake: River Teviot
- Builder: Hall, Russell & Company, Aberdeen
- Laid down: 4 October 1941
- Launched: 12 October 1942
- Commissioned: 30 January 1943
- Fate: Scrapped, 29 March 1955

General characteristics
- Class & type: River-class frigate
- Displacement: 1,370 long tons (1,390 t); 1,830 long tons (1,860 t) (deep load)
- Length: 283 ft (86.26 m) p/p; 301.25 ft (91.82 m)o/a
- Beam: 36.5 ft (11.13 m)
- Draught: 9 ft (2.74 m); 13 ft (3.96 m) (deep load)
- Propulsion: 2 × Admiralty 3-drum boilers, 2 shafts, reciprocating vertical triple expansion, 5,500 ihp (4,100 kW)
- Speed: 20 knots (37.0 km/h)
- Range: 440 long tons (450 t; 490 short tons) oil fuel; 7,200 nautical miles (13,334 km) at 12 knots (22.2 km/h)
- Complement: 107
- Armament: 2 × QF 4-inch (102 mm) Mk.XIX guns, single mounts CP Mk.XXIII; up to 10 × QF 20 mm Oerlikon AA guns on twin mounts Mk.V and single mounts Mk.III; 1 × Hedgehog 24 spigot A/S projector; up to 150 depth charges

HMS Teviot (K222) was a River-class frigate of the Royal Navy (RN) from 1942–1955. She served in convoy defence duties in the North Atlantic and Eastern Fleet during World War II. After the war, she served in the South African Navy as HMSAS Teviot before returning to Royal Navy service after six months. Teviot was built to the RN's specifications as a Group I River-class frigate.

The River class was a class of 151 frigates launched between 1941 and 1944 for use as anti-submarine convoy escorts and were named for rivers in the United Kingdom. The ships were designed by naval engineer William Reed, of Smith's Dock Company of South Bank-on-Tees, to have the endurance and anti-submarine capabilities of the Black Swan-class sloops, while being quick and cheap to build in civil dockyards using the machinery (e.g. reciprocating steam engines instead of turbines) and construction techniques pioneered in the building of the Flower-class corvettes. Its purpose was to improve on the convoy escort classes in service with the Royal Navy at the time, including the Flower class.

After commissioning in January 1943, Teviot participated in anti-submarine warfare exercises off Tobermory, Mull and Lough Foyle before being assigned for convoy escort duty. On 4 July 1943, Teviot picked up 204 survivors of SS City of Venice off Cape Ténès, Algeria. She would have taken part in Operation Zipper, support British landings in Malaya, but the war ended before that operation was put into effect. She was transferred to the South African Navy on 10 June 1945 and returned to the Royal Navy in January 1946.

Teviot was placed in reserve after returning from South African service. In 1954, she was placed on the Disposal List and she was sold for sold and broken up by Thos. W. Ward in Briton Ferry on 29 March 1955.
