= Horst Höltring =

- Born: 30 June 1913; Altona, Hamburg, German Empire
- Died: 24 August 1943 (aged 30); Central Atlantic Ocean
- Military career
- Allegiance: Weimar Republic; Nazi Germany
- Branch: Reichsmarine; Kriegsmarine
- Service years: 1933–43
- Rank: Kapitänleutnant
- Commands: U-149; U-604
- Conflicts: World War II
- Awards: Iron Cross 2nd Class, Iron Cross 1st Class, German Cross in Gold

Horst Höltring (30 June 1913 – 24 August 1943) was a German U-boat commander in World War II.

== Naval career ==
Horst Höltring joined the Reichsmarine in 1933. He went through U-boat training from March to October 1940. On 13 November 1940 he was given command of U-149, a training boat. He served on the boat for more than a year, giving up command on 30 November 1941. From December 1941 to January 1942 he went through U-boat familiarization (Baubelehrung) in preparation for his next command. On 8 January 1942 Höltring commissioned the Type VIIC U-604 at Hamburg. U-604 went on seven patrols, spending 203 days at sea. Six ships were sunk, totaling 40,000 tons. On the 7th patrol the boat was lost. Höltring survived the loss of his boat on 11 August 1943 after she was scuttled following an attack by two American aircraft. The entire crew of 45 men was rescued by two U-boats. Höltring died together with thirteen of his men when the boat that rescued half of his crew, U-185, was sunk 13 days later. According to survivors, when U-185 was fatally hit and chlorine gas was spreading through the boat, Höltring, himself wounded, jumped from his bunk with a pistol and ran to the forward torpedo room where two badly wounded men from U-604 begged to be shot to avoid drowning or suffocating, which he did, before taking his own life. Fourteen men from U-604 died on U-185. U-172 had rescued the rest of Höltring's crew, and reached port with them at Lorient, France on 7 September 1943.

== Summary of career ==
=== Ships sunk ===
Date	U-boat	Name of ship	Nationality	Tonnage	Fate
27 June 1941	U-149	M-99	Soviet Navy	206	Sunk
25 August 1942	U-604	Abbekerk	Netherlands	7,906	Sunk
27 October 1942	U-604	Anglo Mærsk	United Kingdom	7,705	Sunk
30 October 1942	U-604	Président Doumer	United Kingdom	11,898	Sunk
30 October 1942	U-604	Baron Vernon	United Kingdom	3,642	Sunk
2 December 1942	U-604	Coamo	United States	7,057	Sunk
23 February 1943	U-604	Stockport	United Kingdom	1,683	Sunk

=== Awards ===
- Iron Cross 2nd Class
- Iron Cross 1st Class
- German Cross in Gold - 6 November 1943 (posthumous)

== Bibliography ==
- Busch, Rainer; Röll, Hans-Joachim (1999). German U-boat commanders of World War II : a biographical dictionary. Translated by Brooks, Geoffrey. London, Annapolis, Md: Greenhill Books, Naval Institute Press. ISBN 1-55750-186-6.
