= HMS Woodruff =

1941 Flower-class corvette

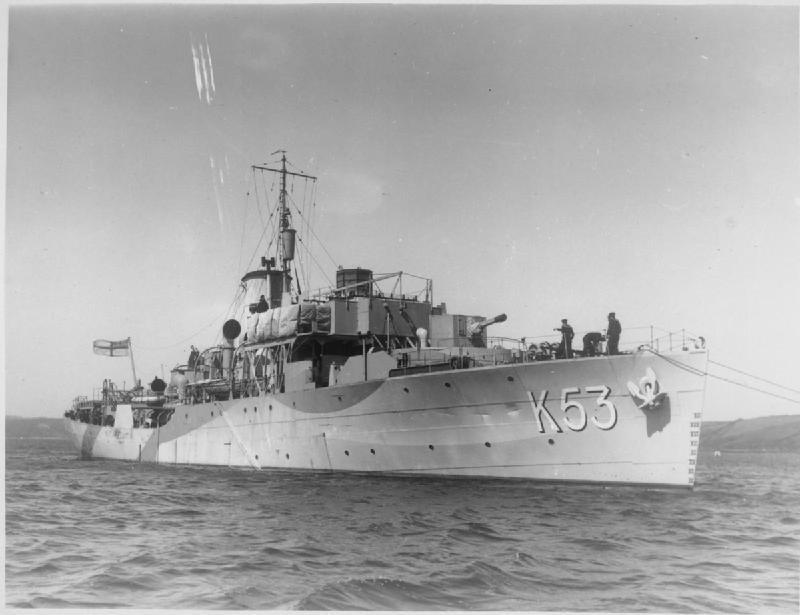
A 1941 picture of the corvette

HMS Woodruff (K53) was a Royal Navy Flower-class Corvette and was built by William Simons & Co. Ltd. in Renfrew, Scotland. It was ordered on 21 September 1939 and launched on 28 February 1941, although it wasn't listed as active unit in the October 1945 Navy List. In 1947, the ship was sold, and turned into a whale catcher in 1948. It was then sold again in the same year to Salvesan and refitted to be a buoy tender at Clelands. It was named Southern Lupin at this time. In 1954, it was laid up in Stromness, and eventually was scrapped in Odense in 1959.
