= German submarine U-659 =

German World War II submarine

History

Nazi Germany
- Name: U-659
- Ordered: 9 October 1939
- Builder: Howaldtswerke, Hamburg
- Yard number: 808
- Laid down: 12 February 1941
- Launched: 14 October 1941
- Commissioned: 9 December 1941
- Fate: Sunk on 4 May 1943

General characteristics
- Class & type: Type VIIC submarine
- Displacement: 769 tonnes (757 long tons) surfaced; 871 t (857 long tons) submerged
- Length: 67.10 m (220 ft 2 in) o/a; 50.50 m (165 ft 8 in) pressure hull
- Beam: 6.20 m (20 ft 4 in) o/a; 4.70 m (15 ft 5 in) pressure hull
- Draught: 4.74 m (15 ft 7 in)
- Installed power: 2,800–3,200 PS (2,100–2,400 kW; 2,800–3,200 bhp) (diesels); 750 PS (550 kW; 740 shp) (electric)
- Propulsion: 2 shafts; 2 × diesel engines; 2 × electric motors
- Speed: 17.7 knots (32.8 km/h; 20.4 mph) surfaced; 7.6 knots (14.1 km/h; 8.7 mph) submerged
- Range: 8,500 nmi (15,700 km; 9,800 mi) at 10 knots (19 km/h; 12 mph) surfaced; 80 nmi (150 km; 92 mi) at 4 knots (7.4 km/h; 4.6 mph) submerged
- Test depth: 230 m (750 ft); Crush depth: 250–295 m (820–968 ft)
- Complement: 4 officers, 40–56 enlisted
- Armament: 5 × 53.3 cm (21 in) torpedo tubes (four bow, one stern); 14 × torpedoes; 1 × 8.8 cm (3.46 in) deck gun (220 rounds); 1 x 2 cm (0.79 in) C/30 AA gun

Service record
- Part of: 5th U-boat Flotilla; 9 December 1941 – 31 August 1942; 9th U-boat Flotilla; 1 September 1942 – 4 May 1943
- Identification codes: M 47 074
- Commanders: K.Kapt. Hans Stock; 9 December 1941 – 4 May 1943
- Operations: 5 patrols: 1st patrol: 15 August – 16 September 1942; 2nd patrol: 14 October – 5 November 1942; 3rd patrol: 12 December 1942 – 5 January 1943; 4th patrol: 8 February – 20 March 1943; 5th patrol: 25 April – 4 May 1943
- Victories: 1 merchant ship sunk (7,519 GRT); 3 merchant ships damaged (21,565 GRT)

German submarine U-659 was a Type VIIC U-boat built for Nazi Germany's Kriegsmarine for service during World War II. She was laid down on 12 February 1941 by Howaldtswerke, Hamburg as yard number 808, launched on 14 October 1941 and commissioned on 9 December 1941 under Oberleutnant zur See Hans Stock.

== Design ==
German Type VIIC submarines were preceded by the shorter Type VIIB submarines. U-659 had a displacement of 769 tonnes (757 long tons) when at the surface and 871 tonnes (857 long tons) while submerged. She had a total length of 67.10 m (220 ft 2 in), a pressure hull length of 50.50 m (165 ft 8 in), a beam of 6.20 m (20 ft 4 in), a height of 9.60 m (31 ft 6 in), and a draught of 4.74 m (15 ft 7 in). The submarine was powered by two Germaniawerft F46 four-stroke, six-cylinder supercharged diesel engines producing a total of 2,800 to 3,200 metric horsepower (2,060 to 2,350 kW; 2,760 to 3,160 shp) for use while surfaced, two Siemens-Schuckert GU 343/38-8 double-acting electric motors producing a total of 750 metric horsepower (550 kW; 740 shp) for use while submerged. She had two shafts and two 1.23 m (4 ft) propellers. The boat was capable of operating at depths of up to 230 metres (750 ft).

The submarine had a maximum surface speed of 17.7 knots (32.8 km/h; 20.4 mph) and a maximum submerged speed of 7.6 knots (14.1 km/h; 8.7 mph). When submerged, the boat could operate for 80 nautical miles (150 km; 92 mi) at 4 knots (7.4 km/h; 4.6 mph); when surfaced, she could travel 8,500 nautical miles (15,700 km; 9,800 mi) at 10 knots (19 km/h; 12 mph). U-659 was fitted with five 53.3 cm (21 in) torpedo tubes (four fitted at the bow and one at the stern), fourteen torpedoes, one 8.8 cm (3.46 in) SK C/35 naval gun, 220 rounds, and a 2 cm (0.79 in) C/30 anti-aircraft gun. The boat had a complement of between forty-four and sixty.

== Service history ==
The boat's career began with training at the 5th U-boat Flotilla on 9 December 1941, followed by active service on 1 September 1942 as part of the 9th Flotilla for the remainder of her service. In five patrols she sank one merchant ship, for a total of 7,519 gross register tons (GRT), and damaged three others.

=== Wolfpacks ===
U-659 took part in seven wolfpacks, namely:

- Vorwärts (25 August – 11 September 1942)
- Streitaxt (20 – 31 October 1942)
- Spitz (22 – 29 December 1942)
- Neptun (18 February – 3 March 1943)
- Westmark (6 – 8 March 1943)
- Neuland (8 – 13 March 1943)
- Drossel (29 April – 4 May 1943)

=== Fate ===
U-659 sank on 4 May 1943 in the North Atlantic in position 43°32′N 13°20′W after colliding with U-439, when both were stalking a Gibraltar convoy. There were just 3 survivors, and 44 hands lost.

== Summary of raiding history ==
Date	Ship Name	Nationality	Tonnage (GRT)	Fate
10 September 1942	Empire Oil	United Kingdom	8,029	Damaged
30 October 1942	Bullmouth	United Kingdom	7,519	Sunk
30 October 1942	Corinaldo	United Kingdom	7,131	Damaged
30 October 1942	Tasmania	United Kingdom	6,405	Damaged

== Bibliography ==
- Busch, Rainer; Röll, Hans-Joachim (1999). German U-boat commanders of World War II : a biographical dictionary. Translated by Brooks, Geoffrey. London, Annapolis, Md: Greenhill Books, Naval Institute Press. ISBN 1-55750-186-6.
- Busch, Rainer; Röll, Hans-Joachim (1999). Der U-Boot-Krieg, 1939-1945: Deutsche U-Boot-Verluste von September 1939 bis Mai 1945 [German U-boat losses from September 1939 to May 1945] (in German). Vol. IV. Hamburg, Berlin, Bonn: Mittler. ISBN 3-8132-0514-2.
- Edwards, Bernard (1996). Dönitz and the Wolf Packs - The U-boats at War. Cassell. pp. 105–107, 117, 123, 124, 189. ISBN 0-304-35203-9.
- Gröner, Eric; Jung, Dieter; Maass, Martin (1991). German Warships 1815-1945: U-boats and Mine Warfare Vessels. Vol. 2. Translated by Thomas, Keith; Magowan, Rachel. London: Conway Maritime Press. ISBN 0-85177-593-4.
- Sharpe, Peter (1998). U-Boat Fact File. Great Britain: Midland Publishing. ISBN 1-85780-072-9.
