= German submarine U-604 =

German World War II submarine

History

Nazi Germany
- Name: U-604
- Ordered: 22 May 1940
- Builder: Blohm & Voss, Hamburg
- Yard number: 580
- Laid down: 27 February 1941
- Launched: 16 November 1941
- Commissioned: 8 January 1942
- Fate: Scuttled on 11 August 1943 at position 04°30′S 21°20′W in the South Atlantic after being depth charged by two US aircraft, a Ventura and a Liberator.

General characteristics
- Class & type: Type VIIC submarine
- Displacement: 769 tonnes (757 long tons) surfaced; 871 t (857 long tons) submerged
- Length: 67.10 m (220 ft 2 in) o/a; 50.50 m (165 ft 8 in) pressure hull
- Beam: 6.20 m (20 ft 4 in) o/a; 4.70 m (15 ft 5 in) pressure hull
- Height: 9.60 m (31 ft 6 in)
- Draught: 4.74 m (15 ft 7 in)
- Installed power: 2,800–3,200 PS (2,100–2,400 kW; 2,800–3,200 bhp) (diesels); 750 PS (550 kW; 740 shp) (electric)
- Propulsion: 2 shafts; 2 × diesel engines; 2 × electric motors
- Speed: 17.7 knots (32.8 km/h; 20.4 mph) surfaced; 7.6 knots (14.1 km/h; 8.7 mph) submerged
- Range: 8,500 nmi (15,700 km; 9,800 mi) at 10 knots (19 km/h; 12 mph) surfaced; 80 nmi (150 km; 92 mi) at 4 knots (7.4 km/h; 4.6 mph) submerged
- Test depth: 230 m (750 ft); Crush depth: 250–295 m (820–968 ft)
- Complement: 4 officers, 40–56 enlisted
- Armament: 5 × 53.3 cm (21 in) torpedo tubes (four bow, one stern); 14 × torpedoes or 26 TMA mines; 1 × 8.8 cm (3.46 in) deck gun (220 rounds); 1 x 2 cm (0.79 in) C/30 AA gun

Service record
- Part of: 5th U-boat Flotilla; 8 January – 31 July 1942; 9th U-boat Flotilla; 1 August 1942 – 11 August 1943
- Identification codes: M 27 582
- Commanders: Kptlt. Horst Höltring; 8 January 1942 – 11 August 1943
- Operations: 6 patrols: 1st patrol: 4 August – 8 September 1942; 2nd patrol: 14 October – 5 November 1942; 3rd patrol: 26 November – 31 December 1942; 4th patrol: 8 February – 9 March 1943; 5th patrol: 22 – 26 April 1943; 6th patrol: 24 June – 11 August 1943
- Victories: 6 merchant ships sunk (39,891 GRT)

German submarine U-604 was a Type VIIC U-boat built for Nazi Germany's Kriegsmarine for service during World War II. She was laid down on 27 February 1941 by Blohm & Voss in Hamburg as yard number 580, launched on 16 November 1941 and commissioned on 8 January 1942 under Kapitänleutnant Horst Höltring (German Cross in Gold).

== Design ==
German Type VIIC submarines were preceded by the shorter Type VIIB submarines. U-604 had a displacement of 769 tonnes (757 long tons) when at the surface and 871 tonnes (857 long tons) while submerged. She had a total length of 67.10 m (220 ft 2 in), a pressure hull length of 50.50 m (165 ft 8 in), a beam of 6.20 m (20 ft 4 in), a height of 9.60 m (31 ft 6 in), and a draught of 4.74 m (15 ft 7 in). The submarine was powered by two Germaniawerft F46 four-stroke, six-cylinder supercharged diesel engines producing a total of 2,800 to 3,200 metric horsepower (2,060 to 2,350 kW; 2,760 to 3,160 shp) for use while surfaced, two Brown, Boveri & Cie GG UB 720/8 double-acting electric motors producing a total of 750 metric horsepower (550 kW; 740 shp) for use while submerged. She had two shafts and two 1.23 m (4 ft) propellers. The boat was capable of operating at depths of up to 230 metres (750 ft).

The submarine had a maximum surface speed of 17.7 knots (32.8 km/h; 20.4 mph) and a maximum submerged speed of 7.6 knots (14.1 km/h; 8.7 mph). When submerged, the boat could operate for 80 nautical miles (150 km; 92 mi) at 4 knots (7.4 km/h; 4.6 mph); when surfaced, she could travel 8,500 nautical miles (15,700 km; 9,800 mi) at 10 knots (19 km/h; 12 mph). U-604 was fitted with five 53.3 cm (21 in) torpedo tubes (four fitted at the bow and one at the stern), fourteen torpedoes, one 8.8 cm (3.46 in) SK C/35 naval gun, 220 rounds, and a 2 cm (0.79 in) C/30 anti-aircraft gun. The boat had a complement of between forty-four and sixty.

== Service history ==
The boat's service began on 8 January 1942 for training as part of the 5th U-boat Flotilla. After training was completed she transferred to the 9th flotilla on 1 August 1942 for active service.

In 6 patrols she sank 6 ships for a total of 39,891 gross register tons (GRT).

=== Wolfpacks ===
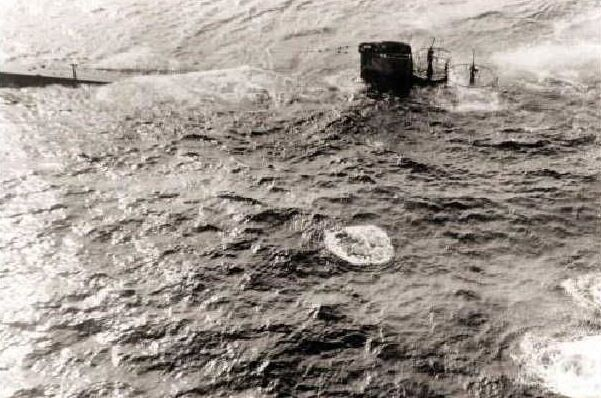
U-604 under attack of the VB-129.

She took part in five wolfpacks, namely:

- Vorwärts (25 August – 1 September 1942)
- Streitaxt (20 – 31 October 1942)
- Draufgänger (1 – 11 December 1942)
- Ungestüm (11 – 22 December 1942)
- Knappen (19 – 25 February 1943)

=== Fate ===
She was scuttled on 11 August 1943 at position 04°30′S 21°20′W in the South Atlantic after being depth charged by two US aircraft, a Ventura and a Liberator. Her crew was rescued by U-185.

== Summary of raiding history ==
Date	Ship Name	Nationality	Tonnage (GRT)	Fate
25 August 1942	Abbekerk	Netherlands	7,906	Sunk
27 October 1942	Anglo Maersk	United Kingdom	7,705	Sunk
30 October 1942	Président Doumer	United Kingdom	11,898	Sunk
30 October 1942	Baron Vernon	United Kingdom	3,642	Sunk
2 December 1942	Coamo	United States	7,057	Sunk
23 February 1943	Stockport	United Kingdom	1,683	Sunk

== Bibliography ==
- Busch, Rainer; Röll, Hans-Joachim (1999). German U-boat commanders of World War II : a biographical dictionary. Translated by Brooks, Geoffrey. London, Annapolis, Md: Greenhill Books, Naval Institute Press. ISBN 1-55750-186-6.
- Busch, Rainer; Röll, Hans-Joachim (1999). Der U-Boot-Krieg, 1939-1945: Deutsche U-Boot-Verluste von September 1939 bis Mai 1945 [German U-boat losses from September 1939 to May 1945] (in German). Vol. IV. Hamburg, Berlin, Bonn: Mittler. ISBN 3-8132-0514-2.
- Edwards, Bernard (1996). Dönitz and the Wolf Packs – The U-Boats at War. London, UK: Cassell Military Classics. pp. 104, 117, 119, 124, 159. ISBN 0-304-35203-9.
- Gröner, Eric; Jung, Dieter; Maass, Martin (1991). German Warships 1815-1945: U-boats and Mine Warfare Vessels. Vol. 2. Translated by Thomas, Keith; Magowan, Rachel. London: Conway Maritime Press. ISBN 0-85177-593-4.
