= HMS Egret (L75) =

Lead ship of Egret-class sloop-of-war

Coordinates: 42°10′N 9°22′W

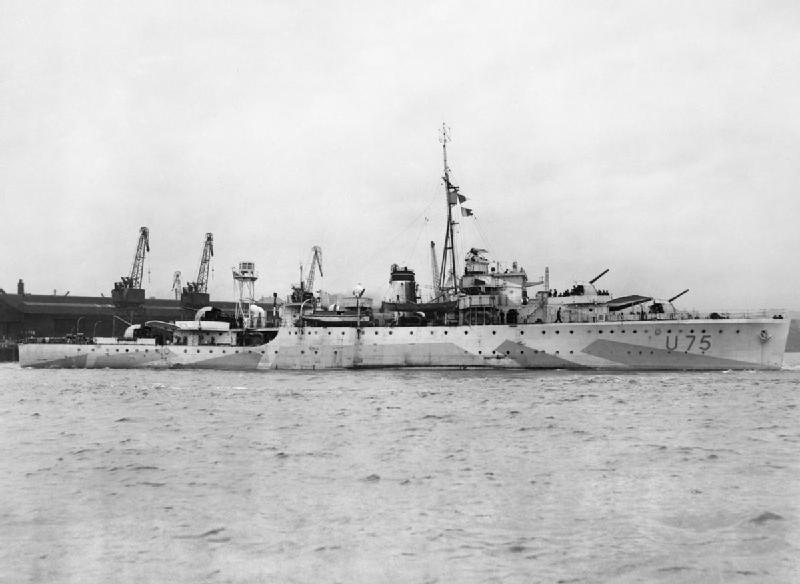
- Egret

History

United Kingdom
- Name: Egret
- Builder: J. Samuel White of Cowes, Isle of Wight
- Laid down: 21 September 1937
- Launched: 31 May 1938
- Commissioned: 11 November 1938
- Identification: Pennant number: L75
- Fate: Sunk 27 August 1943

General characteristics
- Class & type: Egret-class sloop
- Displacement: 1,200 tons
- Length: 276 ft (84 m)
- Propulsion: Geared steam turbines on two shafts; 3,600 shp (2,700 kW)
- Speed: 19.25 knots (35.65 km/h; 22.15 mph)
- Complement: 188
- Armament: 8 × 4-inch (102 mm) (4 × 2); 4 × 0.5-inch (13 mm) (1 × 4)

HMS Egret was a sloop of the British Royal Navy, the lead ship of her class. She was built by J. Samuel White at Cowes, Isle of Wight, was launched on 31 May 1938, and entered service on 11 November that year. Egret served as a convoy escort with the Western Approaches Command from 1940 until her loss in August 1943: She was on anti-submarine patrol in the Bay of Biscay when she was sunk by a guided missile in combat, the first ship to be lost in this manner. Egret sank quickly with the loss of all 198 of her crew.

== Construction ==
On 5 March 1937, the British Admiralty ordered two sloops-of-war of a new class, Egret and Auckland as part of the 1936 construction programme. (Note: The third ship of the class, Pelican, was ordered on 19 March 1937.) Egret was laid down at J. Samuel White's Cowes, Isle of Wight shipyard on 21 September 1937. The ship was launched on 31 May 1938 and completed on 10 November 1938.

== Service history ==
At the outbreak of the Second World War Egret was at Laurenco Marques in East Africa. She was briefly employed in hunting for raiders in the Indian Ocean before returning to the UK via Suez and Gibraltar. In 1940 Egret was based at Rosyth employed as escort to east coast convoys in the North Sea, and remained at this duty during the Norway campaign. In December transferred to Western Approaches Command, and was based at Londonderry for escort duty for SL/OS convoys to and from Freetown, in West Africa.

In June 1941 Egret was in dock for a refit before returning to escort duty

In January 1942, she was escorting SL 97 when it came under attack by German aircraft and a group of U-boats. The convoy was reinforced by the Gibraltar Strike Force, an ASW support group, and U-93 was destroyed with no loss to the convoy.

In October Egret took part in Operation Torch, the Allied landings in French North Africa.

In December she was escorting convoy MKF 4 from Gibraltar when they intercepted the blockade runner Germania, which was scuttled by her crew to avoid capture.

In 1943 Egret remained on escort duty protecting convoys to and from North Africa; in August 1943, while escorting MKF 20 from Gibraltar, Egret and her escort group were detailed to relieve 40 EG which was operating against U-boats traversing the Bay of Biscay.

== Fate ==
The British Bay offensive in the summer of 1943 saw aircraft from RAF Coastal Command patrolling the Bay of Biscay and attacking U-boats as they travelled to and from their bases in occupied France. A mistaken decision on the part of U-boat commander, Adm. Karl Dönitz, had led to U-boats resisting air attack by remaining on the surface and fighting back with anti-aircraft weapons, rather than diving to safety underwater, a policy which led to the loss of a number of boats. An escalation of the campaign had seen German and British long-range fighters, and then RN escort groups joining the fray. In mid-August 1943 40 EG was on station and came under air attack; on 25 August 1943 the Germans had used their Henschel Hs 293 glide bomb for the first time, against the ships of 40 EG in the Bay of Biscay. Landguard was slightly damaged by a near miss. Bideford was hit and damaged, with one sailor killed, though more serious damage was avoided because the bomb's explosive charge did not fully detonate.

On 27 August 1943 the 40th Support Group was relieved by the 1st Support Group, consisting of Egret together with the sloop Pelican and the frigates Jed, Rother, Spey and Evenlode. The group was attacked by a squadron of 18 Dornier Do 217 carrying Henschel glide bombs. One of the two covering destroyers, HMCS Athabaskan, was heavily damaged and Egret was sunk with the loss of 194 of her crew. At the time there were four RAF Y-Service electronics specialists on board, all of whom also died in the attack, thus bringing the total killed to 198. (These four RAF personnel are typically excluded from published casualty figures.) Egret had been fitted with electronic surveillance equipment designed to monitor Luftwaffe bomber communications and these Y-Service technicians were aboard to operate this equipment. The other destroyer, Grenville, commanded by Roger Hill, was attacked by the Dorniers firing one missile at a time, but survived by being able to out-turn the glide bombs.

Egret's sinking led to the anti-U-boat patrols in the Bay of Biscay being suspended.

HMS Egret was the first ship ever to be sunk by a guided missile.

== See also ==
- List of ships sunk by missiles
