= German submarine U-311 =

German World War II submarine

Coordinates: 52°09′N 19°07′W

History

Nazi Germany
- Name: U-311
- Ordered: 5 June 1940
- Builder: Flender Werke, Lübeck
- Yard number: 311
- Laid down: 21 March 1942
- Launched: 20 January 1943
- Commissioned: 23 March 1943
- Fate: Sunk on 22 April 1944

General characteristics
- Class & type: Type VIIC submarine
- Displacement: 769 tonnes (757 long tons) surfaced; 871 t (857 long tons) submerged
- Length: 67.10 m (220 ft 2 in) o/a; 50.50 m (165 ft 8 in) pressure hull
- Beam: 6.20 m (20 ft 4 in) o/a; 4.70 m (15 ft 5 in) pressure hull
- Height: 9.60 m (31 ft 6 in)
- Draught: 4.74 m (15 ft 7 in)
- Installed power: 2,800–3,200 PS (2,100–2,400 kW; 2,800–3,200 bhp) (diesels); 750 PS (550 kW; 740 shp) (electric)
- Propulsion: 2 shafts; 2 × diesel engines; 2 × electric motors.
- Speed: 17.7 knots (32.8 km/h; 20.4 mph) surfaced; 7.6 knots (14.1 km/h; 8.7 mph) submerged
- Range: 8,500 nmi (15,700 km; 9,800 mi) at 10 knots (19 km/h; 12 mph) surfaced; 80 nmi (150 km; 92 mi) at 4 knots (7.4 km/h; 4.6 mph) submerged
- Test depth: 230 m (750 ft); Crush depth: 250–295 m (820–968 ft)
- Complement: 4 officers, 40–56 enlisted
- Armament: 5 × 53.3 cm (21 in) torpedo tubes (four bow, one stern); 14 × torpedoes or 26 TMA mines; 1 × 8.8 cm (3.46 in) deck gun (220 rounds); 2 × twin 2 cm (0.79 in) C/30 anti-aircraft guns

Service record
- Part of: 8th U-boat Flotilla; 23 March – 30 November 1943; 1st U-boat Flotilla; 1 December 1943 – 22 April 1944
- Identification codes: M 50 908
- Commanders: Kptlt. Joachim Zander; 23 March 1943 – 22 April 1944
- Operations: 2 patrols: 1st patrol: 25 November 1943 – 26 January 1944; 2nd patrol: 7 March – 22 April 1944
- Victories: 1 merchant ship sunk (10,342 GRT)

German submarine U-311 was a Type VIIC U-boat of Nazi Germany's Kriegsmarine during World War II. The submarine was laid down on 21 March 1942 at the Flender Werke yard at Lübeck as yard number 311, launched on 20 January 1943 and commissioned on 23 March under the command of Kapitänleutnant Joachim Zander.

During her short career, the U-boat sailed on two combat patrols, sinking a single ship, before she was sunk on 22 April 1944.

== Design ==
German Type VIIC submarines were preceded by the shorter Type VIIB submarines. U-311 had a displacement of 769 tonnes (757 long tons) when at the surface and 871 tonnes (857 long tons) while submerged. She had a total length of 67.10 m (220 ft 2 in), a pressure hull length of 50.50 m (165 ft 8 in), a beam of 6.20 m (20 ft 4 in), a height of 9.60 m (31 ft 6 in), and a draught of 4.74 m (15 ft 7 in). The submarine was powered by two Germaniawerft F46 four-stroke, six-cylinder supercharged diesel engines producing a total of 2,800 to 3,200 metric horsepower (2,060 to 2,350 kW; 2,760 to 3,160 shp) for use while surfaced, two Garbe, Lahmeyer & Co. RP 137/c double-acting electric motors producing a total of 750 metric horsepower (550 kW; 740 shp) for use while submerged. She had two shafts and two 1.23 m (4 ft) propellers. The boat was capable of operating at depths of up to 230 metres (750 ft).

The submarine had a maximum surface speed of 17.7 knots (32.8 km/h; 20.4 mph) and a maximum submerged speed of 7.6 knots (14.1 km/h; 8.7 mph). When submerged, the boat could operate for 80 nautical miles (150 km; 92 mi) at 4 knots (7.4 km/h; 4.6 mph); when surfaced, she could travel 8,500 nautical miles (15,700 km; 9,800 mi) at 10 knots (19 km/h; 12 mph). U-311 was fitted with five 53.3 cm (21 in) torpedo tubes (four fitted at the bow and one at the stern), fourteen torpedoes, one 8.8 cm (3.46 in) SK C/35 naval gun, 220 rounds, and two twin 2 cm (0.79 in) C/30 anti-aircraft guns. The boat had a complement of between forty-four and sixty.

== Service history ==
=== First patrol ===
After training with the 8th U-boat Flotilla at Kiel, U-311 was transferred to the 1st U-boat Flotilla based at Brest in France, for front-line service on 25 November 1943. On that day she departed Kiel and sailed out into the middle of the Atlantic, via the North Sea and the gap between Iceland and the Faroe Islands. She operated as part of 8 wolfpacks before arriving at Brest on 26 January 1944.

=== Second patrol and loss ===
U-311 sailed from Brest on 7 March 1944. On the 19th, she sank the Seakay 375 nautical miles (694 km; 432 mi) west of Fastnet. On 22 April, she was sunk by depth charges dropped by the Canadian frigates HMCS Matane and Swansea.

=== Previously recorded fate ===
The boat was previously thought to have been sunk southwest of Ireland on 24 April 1944 by a Canadian Sunderland flying boat of 423 Squadron, RCAF.

=== Wolfpacks ===
U-311 took part in eight wolfpacks, namely:

- Coronel (7 – 8 December 1943)
- Coronel 1 (8 – 14 December 1943)
- Coronel 2 (14 – 17 December 1943)
- Amrum (18 – 23 December 1943)
- Rügen 5 (23 December 1943 – 2 January 1944)
- Rügen 4 (2 – 7 January 1944)
- Rügen (7 – 19 January 1944)
- Preussen (19 – 22 March 1944)

== Summary of raiding history ==
Date	Ship Name	Nationality	Tonnage (GRT)	Fate
19 March 1944	Seakay	United States	10,342	Sunk

== Bibliography ==
- Busch, Rainer; Röll, Hans-Joachim (1999). German U-boat commanders of World War II : a biographical dictionary. Translated by Brooks, Geoffrey. London, Annapolis, Md: Greenhill Books, Naval Institute Press. ISBN 1-55750-186-6.
- Busch, Rainer; Röll, Hans-Joachim (1999). Der U-Boot-Krieg, 1939-1945: Deutsche U-Boot-Verluste von September 1939 bis Mai 1945 [German U-boat losses from September 1939 to May 1945] (in German). Vol. IV. Hamburg, Berlin, Bonn: Mittler. ISBN 3-8132-0514-2.
- Gröner, Erich; Jung, Dieter; Maass, Martin (1991). U-boats and Mine Warfare Vessels. German Warships 1815–1945. Vol. 2. Translated by Thomas, Keith; Magowan, Rachel. London: Conway Maritime Press. ISBN 0-85177-593-4.
- Kemp, Paul (1999). U-Boats Destroyed - German Submarine Losses in the World Wars. London: Arms & Armour. ISBN 1-85409-515-3.
