= German submarine U-773 =

German World War II submarine

- U-570 Type VIIC submarine that was captured by the British in 1941. This U-boat is almost identical to U-773.

History

Nazi Germany
- Name: U-773
- Ordered: 21 November 1940
- Builder: Kriegsmarinewerft, Wilhelmshaven
- Yard number: 156
- Laid down: 13 October 1942
- Launched: 8 December 1943
- Commissioned: 20 January 1944
- Fate: Surrendered on 9 May 1945; sunk as part of Operation Deadlight on 8 December 1945

General characteristics
- Class & type: Type VIIC submarine
- Displacement: 769 tonnes (757 long tons) surfaced; 871 t (857 long tons) submerged
- Length: 67.10 m (220 ft 2 in) o/a; 50.50 m (165 ft 8 in) pressure hull
- Beam: 6.20 m (20 ft 4 in) o/a; 4.70 m (15 ft 5 in) pressure hull
- Height: 9.60 m (31 ft 6 in)
- Draught: 4.74 m (15 ft 7 in)
- Installed power: 2,800–3,200 PS (2,100–2,400 kW; 2,800–3,200 bhp) (diesels); 750 PS (550 kW; 740 shp) (electric)
- Propulsion: 2 shafts; 2 × diesel engines; 2 × electric motors
- Speed: 17.7 knots (32.8 km/h; 20.4 mph) surfaced; 7.6 knots (14.1 km/h; 8.7 mph) submerged
- Range: 8,500 nmi (15,700 km; 9,800 mi) at 10 knots (19 km/h; 12 mph) surfaced; 80 nmi (150 km; 92 mi) at 4 knots (7.4 km/h; 4.6 mph) submerged
- Test depth: 220 m (720 ft); Crush depth: 250–295 m (820–968 ft)
- Complement: 4 officers, 44–52 enlisted
- Armament: 5 × 53.3 cm (21 in) torpedo tubes (four bow, one stern); 14 × torpedoes or; 26 TMA mines; 1 × 3.7 cm (1.5 in) Flak M42 AA gun; 2 × twin 2 cm (0.79 in) C/30 anti-aircraft guns

Service record
- Part of: 31st U-boat Flotilla; 20 January – 31 July 1944; 1st U-boat Flotilla; 1 August – 30 September 1944; 11th U-boat Flotilla; 1 October 1944 – 8 May 1945
- Identification codes: M 49 058
- Commanders: Oblt.z.S. Richard Lange; 20 January – 17 April 1944; Oblt.z.S. Hugo Baldus; 18 April 1944 – 9 May 1945
- Operations: 3 patrols: 1st patrol: 15 October – 18 November 1944; 2nd patrol: a. 7 December 1944 – 10 January 1945; b. 14 – 23 January 1945; 3rd patrol: 19 February – 14 April 1945
- Victories: None

German submarine U-773 was a Type VIIC U-boat of Nazi Germany's Kriegsmarine during World War II.

She was ordered on 21 November 1940, and was laid down on 13 October 1942, at Kriegsmarinewerft, Wilhelmshaven, as yard number 156. She was launched on 8 December 1943, and commissioned under the command of Oberleutnant zur See Richard Lange on 20 January 1944.

== Design ==
German Type VIIC submarines were preceded by the shorter Type VIIB submarines. U-773 had a displacement of 769 tonnes (757 long tons) when at the surface and 871 tonnes (857 long tons) while submerged. She had a total length of 67.10 m (220 ft 2 in), a pressure hull length of 50.50 m (165 ft 8 in), a beam of 6.20 m (20 ft 4 in), a height of 9.60 m (31 ft 6 in), and a draught of 4.74 m (15 ft 7 in). The submarine was powered by two Germaniawerft F46 four-stroke, six-cylinder supercharged diesel engines producing a total of 2,800 to 3,200 metric horsepower (2,060 to 2,350 kW; 2,760 to 3,160 shp) for use while surfaced, two Garbe, Lahmeyer & Co. RP 137/c double-acting electric motors producing a total of 750 metric horsepower (550 kW; 740 shp) for use while submerged. She had two shafts and two 1.23 m (4 ft) propellers. The boat was capable of operating at depths of up to 230 metres (750 ft).

The submarine had a maximum surface speed of 17.7 knots (32.8 km/h; 20.4 mph) and a maximum submerged speed of 7.6 knots (14.1 km/h; 8.7 mph). When submerged, the boat could operate for 80 nautical miles (150 km; 92 mi) at 4 knots (7.4 km/h; 4.6 mph); when surfaced, she could travel 8,500 nautical miles (15,700 km; 9,800 mi) at 10 knots (19 km/h; 12 mph). U-773 was fitted with five 53.3 cm (21 in) torpedo tubes (four fitted at the bow and one at the stern), fourteen torpedoes or 26 TMA mines, one 3.7 cm (1.5 in) Flak M42 and two twin 2 cm (0.79 in) C/30 anti-aircraft guns. The boat had a complement of between 44 — 52 men.

== Service history ==
U-773 participated in three war patrols that yielded no ships sunk or damaged.

On 9 May 1945, U-773 surrendered at Lofjord, near Trondheim, Norway. She was later transferred to Loch Ryan, Scotland on 29 May 1945. Of the 156 U-boats that eventually surrendered to the Allied forces at the end of the war, U-773 was one of 116 selected to take part in Operation Deadlight. U-773 was towed out and sank on 8 December 1945, by unknown causes.

The wreck now lies at 56°10′N 10°05′W.

== Bibliography ==
- Busch, Rainer; Röll, Hans-Joachim (1999). German U-boat commanders of World War II : a biographical dictionary. Translated by Brooks, Geoffrey. London, Annapolis, Md: Greenhill Books, Naval Institute Press. ISBN 1-55750-186-6.
- Busch, Rainer; Röll, Hans-Joachim (1999). Der U-Boot-Krieg, 1939-1945: Deutsche U-Boot-Verluste von September 1939 bis Mai 1945 [German U-boat losses from September 1939 to May 1945] (in German). Vol. IV. Hamburg, Berlin, Bonn: Mittler. ISBN 3-8132-0514-2.
- Gröner, Eric; Jung, Dieter; Maass, Martin (1991). German Warships 1815-1945: U-boats and Mine Warfare Vessels. Vol. 2. Translated by Thomas, Keith; Magowan, Rachel. London: Conway Maritime Press. ISBN 0-85177-593-4.
