= German submarine U-396 =

German World War II submarine

History

Nazi Germany
- Name: U-396
- Ordered: 20 January 1941
- Builder: Howaldtswerke, Kiel
- Yard number: 28
- Laid down: 6 June 1942
- Launched: 27 August 1943
- Commissioned: 16 October 1943
- Fate: Missing since 11 April 1945

General characteristics
- Class & type: Type VIIC submarine
- Displacement: 769 tonnes (757 long tons) surfaced; 871 t (857 long tons) submerged
- Length: 67.23 m (220 ft 7 in) o/a; 50.50 m (165 ft 8 in) pressure hull
- Beam: 6.20 m (20 ft 4 in) o/a; 4.70 m (15 ft 5 in) pressure hull
- Height: 9.60 m (31 ft 6 in)
- Draught: 4.74 m (15 ft 7 in)
- Installed power: 2,800–3,200 PS (2,100–2,400 kW; 2,800–3,200 bhp) (diesels); 750 PS (550 kW; 740 shp) (electric)
- Propulsion: 2 shafts; 2 × diesel engines; 2 × electric motors
- Speed: 17.7 knots (32.8 km/h; 20.4 mph) surfaced; 7.6 knots (14.1 km/h; 8.7 mph) submerged
- Range: 8,500 nmi (15,700 km; 9,800 mi) at 10 knots (19 km/h; 12 mph) surfaced; 80 nmi (150 km; 92 mi) at 4 knots (7.4 km/h; 4.6 mph) submerged
- Test depth: 230 m (750 ft); Crush depth: 250–295 m (820–968 ft)
- Complement: 4 officers, 40–56 enlisted
- Armament: 5 × 53.3 cm (21 in) torpedo tubes (four bow, one stern); 14 × torpedoes; 1 × 3.7 cm (1.5 in) Flak M42 AA gun; 2 × twin 2 cm (0.79 in) C/30 anti-aircraft guns

Service record
- Part of: 5th U-boat Flotilla; 16 October 1943 – 31 May 1944; 1st U-boat Flotilla; 1 June – 30 September 1944; 11th U-boat Flotilla; 1 October 1944 – 11 April 1945
- Identification codes: M 52 277
- Commanders: Kptlt. Ernst-Günther Unterhorst; 16 October – March 1945; Kptlt. Hilmar Siemon; March – 11 April 1945
- Operations: 5 patrols: 1st patrol: 20 June – 3 July 1944; 2nd patrol: 15 – 20 July 1944; 3rd patrol: 6 – 16 August 1944; 4th patrol: 21 October – 19 December 1944; 5th patrol: 13 March – 11 April 1945
- Victories: None

German submarine U-396 was a Type VIIC U-boat of Nazi Germany's Kriegsmarine during World War II.

She carried out five patrols. She did not sink or damage any ships.

She was posted missing since 11 April 1945.

== Design ==
German Type VIIC submarines were preceded by the shorter Type VIIB submarines. U-396 had a displacement of 769 tonnes (757 long tons) when at the surface and 871 tonnes (857 long tons) while submerged. She had a total length of 67.10 m (220 ft 2 in), a pressure hull length of 50.50 m (165 ft 8 in), a beam of 6.20 m (20 ft 4 in), a height of 9.60 m (31 ft 6 in), and a draught of 4.74 m (15 ft 7 in). The submarine was powered by two Germaniawerft F46 four-stroke, six-cylinder supercharged diesel engines producing a total of 2,800 to 3,200 metric horsepower (2,060 to 2,350 kW; 2,760 to 3,160 shp) for use while surfaced, two Garbe, Lahmeyer & Co. RP 137/c double-acting electric motors producing a total of 750 metric horsepower (550 kW; 740 shp) for use while submerged. She had two shafts and two 1.23 m (4 ft) propellers. The boat was capable of operating at depths of up to 230 metres (750 ft).

The submarine had a maximum surface speed of 17.7 knots (32.8 km/h; 20.4 mph) and a maximum submerged speed of 7.6 knots (14.1 km/h; 8.7 mph). When submerged, the boat could operate for 80 nautical miles (150 km; 92 mi) at 4 knots (7.4 km/h; 4.6 mph); when surfaced, she could travel 8,500 nautical miles (15,700 km; 9,800 mi) at 10 knots (19 km/h; 12 mph). U-396 was fitted with five 53.3 cm (21 in) torpedo tubes (four fitted at the bow and one at the stern), fourteen torpedoes, one 3.7 cm (1.5 in) Flak M42 and two twin 2 cm (0.79 in) C/30 anti-aircraft guns. The boat had a complement of between forty-four and sixty.

== Service history ==
The submarine was laid down on 6 June 1942 at the Howaldtswerke (yard) at Flensburg as yard number 28, launched on 27 August 1943 and commissioned on 16 October under the command of Kapitänleutnant Ernst-Günther Unterhorst.

She served with the 5th U-boat Flotilla from 16 October 1943 and the 1st flotilla from 1 June 1944. She was reassigned to the 11h flotilla on 1 October.

=== First patrol ===
The boat departed Kiel on 20 June 1944. On 28 June she was attacked by a British Catalina flying boat of No. 210 Squadron RAF. The only damage was a carbon monoxide leak which was serious enough to cause the submarine to abort her patrol. She arrived at Bergen on 3 July.

=== Second and third patrols ===
These two sorties were relatively uneventful.

=== Fourth patrol ===
U-396 departed Trondheim on 1 October 1944. She entered the north Atlantic Ocean via the gap between Iceland and the Faroe Islands and sailed southeast of Cape Farewell (Greenland). She returned to Trondheim on 19 December. At 60 days, it was her longest patrol.

=== Fifth patrol and loss ===
The boat departed Trondheim for Atlantic weather reporting duties on 13 March 1945. It is known that she sailed between the Faroe and Shetland Islands. She was posted missing since 11 April 1945. No conclusive explanation for her loss exists.

45 men were aboard the U-boat; there were no survivors.

=== Previously recorded fate ===
U-396 was thought to have been sunk on 23 April 1945 southwest of the Shetland Islands by depth charges dropped by a British B-24 Liberator of No. 86 Squadron RAF. This attack was probably against a 'nonsub' target.

== Bibliography ==
- Busch, Rainer; Röll, Hans-Joachim (1999). German U-boat commanders of World War II : a biographical dictionary. Translated by Brooks, Geoffrey. London, Annapolis, Md: Greenhill Books, Naval Institute Press. ISBN 1-55750-186-6.
- Busch, Rainer; Röll, Hans-Joachim (1999). Deutsche U-Boot-Verluste von September 1939 bis Mai 1945 [German U-boat losses from September 1939 to May 1945]. Der U-Boot-Krieg (in German). Vol. IV. Hamburg, Berlin, Bonn: Mittler. ISBN 3-8132-0514-2.
- Gröner, Erich; Jung, Dieter; Maass, Martin (1991). U-boats and Mine Warfare Vessels. German Warships 1815–1945. Vol. 2. Translated by Thomas, Keith; Magowan, Rachel. London: Conway Maritime Press. ISBN 0-85177-593-4.
- Kemp, Paul (1999). U-Boats Destroyed – German Submarine Losses in the World Wars. London: Arms & Armour. ISBN 1-85409-515-3.
