= HMCS Matane =

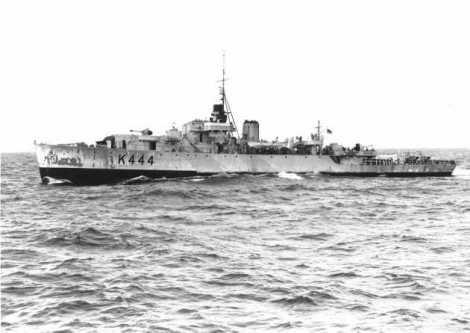
- HMCS Matane

History

Canada
- Name: Matane
- Namesake: Matane, Quebec
- Operator: Royal Canadian Navy
- Ordered: October 1941
- Builder: Canadian Vickers, Montreal
- Laid down: 23 December 1942
- Launched: 29 May 1943
- Commissioned: 22 October 1943
- Decommissioned: 11 February 1946
- Identification: Pennant number: K 444
- Honours and awards: Atlantic 1944, Normandy 1944, Arctic 1945
- Fate: Sold for scrapping 1947

General characteristics
- Class & type: River-class frigate
- Displacement: 1,445 long tons (1,468 t; 1,618 short tons); 2,110 long tons (2,140 t; 2,360 short tons) (deep load)
- Length: 283 ft (86.26 m) p/p; 301.25 ft (91.82 m)o/a
- Beam: 36.5 ft (11.13 m)
- Draught: 9 ft (2.74 m); 13 ft (3.96 m) (deep load)
- Propulsion: 2 x Admiralty 3-drum boilers, 2 shafts, reciprocating vertical triple expansion, 5,500 ihp (4,100 kW)
- Speed: 20 knots (37.0 km/h); 20.5 knots (38.0 km/h) (turbine ships)
- Range: 646 long tons (656 t; 724 short tons) oil fuel; 7,500 nautical miles (13,890 km) at 15 knots (27.8 km/h)
- Complement: 157
- Armament: 2 × QF 4 in (102 mm) /45 Mk. XVI on twin mount HA/LA Mk.XIX; 1 × QF 12 pdr (3 in (76 mm)) 12 cwt /40 Mk. V on mounting HA/LA Mk.IX (not all ships); 8 × 20 mm QF Oerlikon A/A on twin mounts Mk.V; 1 × Hedgehog 24 spigot A/S projector; up to 150 depth charges

HMCS Matane was a River-class frigate that served with the Royal Canadian Navy during the Second World War. She served primarily as a convoy escort in the Battle of the Atlantic. She was named for Matane, Quebec.

Matane was originally ordered as Stormont in October 1941 as part of the 1942–1943 River-class building program. She was laid down on 23 December 1942 by Canadian Vickers Ltd. at Montreal, Quebec and launched 29 May 1943. Her name was changed to Matane in 1942. She was commissioned into the Royal Canadian Navy on 22 October 1943 at Montreal.

== Background ==
The River-class frigate was designed by William Reed of Smith's Dock Company of South Bank-on-Tees. Originally called a "twin-screw corvette", its purpose was to improve on the convoy escort classes in service with the Royal Navy at the time, including the Flower-class corvette. The first orders were placed by the Royal Navy in 1940 and the vessels were named for rivers in the United Kingdom, giving name to the class. In Canada they were named for towns and cities though they kept the same designation. The name "frigate" was suggested by Vice-Admiral Percy Nelles of the Royal Canadian Navy and was adopted later that year.

Improvements over the corvette design included improved accommodation which was markedly better. The twin engines gave only three more knots of speed but extended the range of the ship to nearly double that of a corvette at 7,200 nautical miles (13,300 km) at 12 knots. Among other lessons applied to the design was an armament package better designed to combat U-boats including a twin 4-inch mount forward and 12-pounder aft. 15 Canadian frigates were initially fitted with a single 4-inch gun forward but with the exception of HMCS Valleyfield, they were all eventually upgraded to the double mount. For underwater targets, the River-class frigate was equipped with a Hedgehog anti-submarine mortar and depth charge rails aft and four side-mounted throwers.

River-class frigates were the first Royal Canadian Navy warships to carry the 147B Sword horizontal fan echo sonar transmitter in addition to the irregular ASDIC. This allowed the ship to maintain contact with targets even while firing unless a target was struck. Improved radar and direction-finding equipment improved the RCN's ability to find and track enemy submarines over the previous classes.

Canada originally ordered the construction of 33 frigates in October 1941. The design was too big for the shipyards on the Great Lakes so all the frigates built in Canada were built in dockyards along the west coast or along the St. Lawrence River. In all Canada ordered the construction of 60 frigates including ten for the Royal Navy that transferred two to the United States Navy.

== War service ==
After working up in St. Margaret's Bay and Pictou, Matane joined escort group EG 9 based out of Derry, being made Senior Officer's Ship on arrival. She served mainly in the waters surrounding the United Kingdom thereafter. On 22 April 1944, she and HMCS Swansea sank U-311 by depth charge south west of Iceland. On 6 June 1944, Matane was one of eleven Canadian frigates assigned to the Invasion of Normandy.

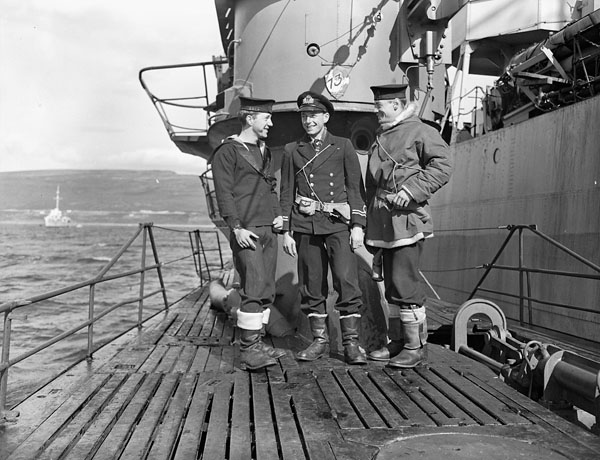
Members of a boarding party from Matane which accepted the surrender of a German submarine depot ship off the coast of Norway, seen aboard a surrendered German submarine, in Loch Eriboll, Scotland, May 1945

While operating off Brest, Matane was hit by a German glider bomb launched by a Dornier Do 217 on 20 July 1944. Three of her crew were killed and the ship was badly damaged, losing propulsion. Matane was towed by HMCS Meon back to Plymouth. She was eventually brought to Dunstaffnage, Scotland to begin eight and half months repair, reappearing in April 1945. After working up at Tobermory, she escorted convoy JW 67 to North Russia. While en route, she was detached from the convoy to escort fourteen surrendered U-boats from Trondheim to Loch Eriboll.

After completing one round trip to Gibraltar escorting a convoy, Matane began her journey to Esquimalt via Derry and Halifax, arriving in July. She remained there until being paid off 11 February 1946. She was sold to Capital Iron & Metals Ltd. of Victoria, British Columbia in 1947 for stripping and her hulk was used as part of a breakwater at Oyster Bay, British Columbia.
