= 1st U-boat Flotilla =

1935–1944 submarine unit of the German Navy

1st U-boat flotilla
- Active: Raised 1935, Dissolved 1944
- Country: Nazi Germany
- Branch: Kriegsmarine
- Type: U-boat flotilla
- Base: Kiel, Brest
- Nickname: Weddigen flotilla

Commanders
- Notable commanders: Fregattenkapitän Karl Dönitz

The 1st U-boat flotilla (German 1. Unterseebootsflottille) also known as the Weddigen flotilla, was the first operational U-boat unit in Nazi Germany's Kriegsmarine (navy). Founded on 27 September 1935 under the command of Fregattenkapitän Karl Dönitz, it was named in honor of Kapitänleutnant Otto Weddigen. Weddigen, a U-boat commander during World War I, died on 18 March 1915 after his submarine U-29 was rammed by the British battleship HMS Dreadnought in the North Sea. Another notable person from the flotilla was Otto Kretschmer, a young commander made infamous due to his high-scoring U-Boat skipper score.

The flotilla at first only consisted of U-9, a Type IIB boat commissioned on 21 August 1935. Later, boats U-1 to U-12 were included in the flotilla, but U-1 to U-6 were only used as training boats and were attached to the U-boat training school in Neustadt. The flotilla paved the path for Germany’s first “Happy Time”, a period of success for the Germans, before the death/capture of 3 of the main captains, two of which belonged to the first flotilla (Kretschmer U-99, and Joachim Schepke U-100) in March 1941. Originally based in Kiel from September 1935 – May 1941, it was moved to Brest, France in June 1941. In that time, they were a part of missions to take over Norway, Denmark, and contributed to the fall of France as well. In September 1944, the flotilla was disbanded and its remaining boats were distributed to other flotillas.

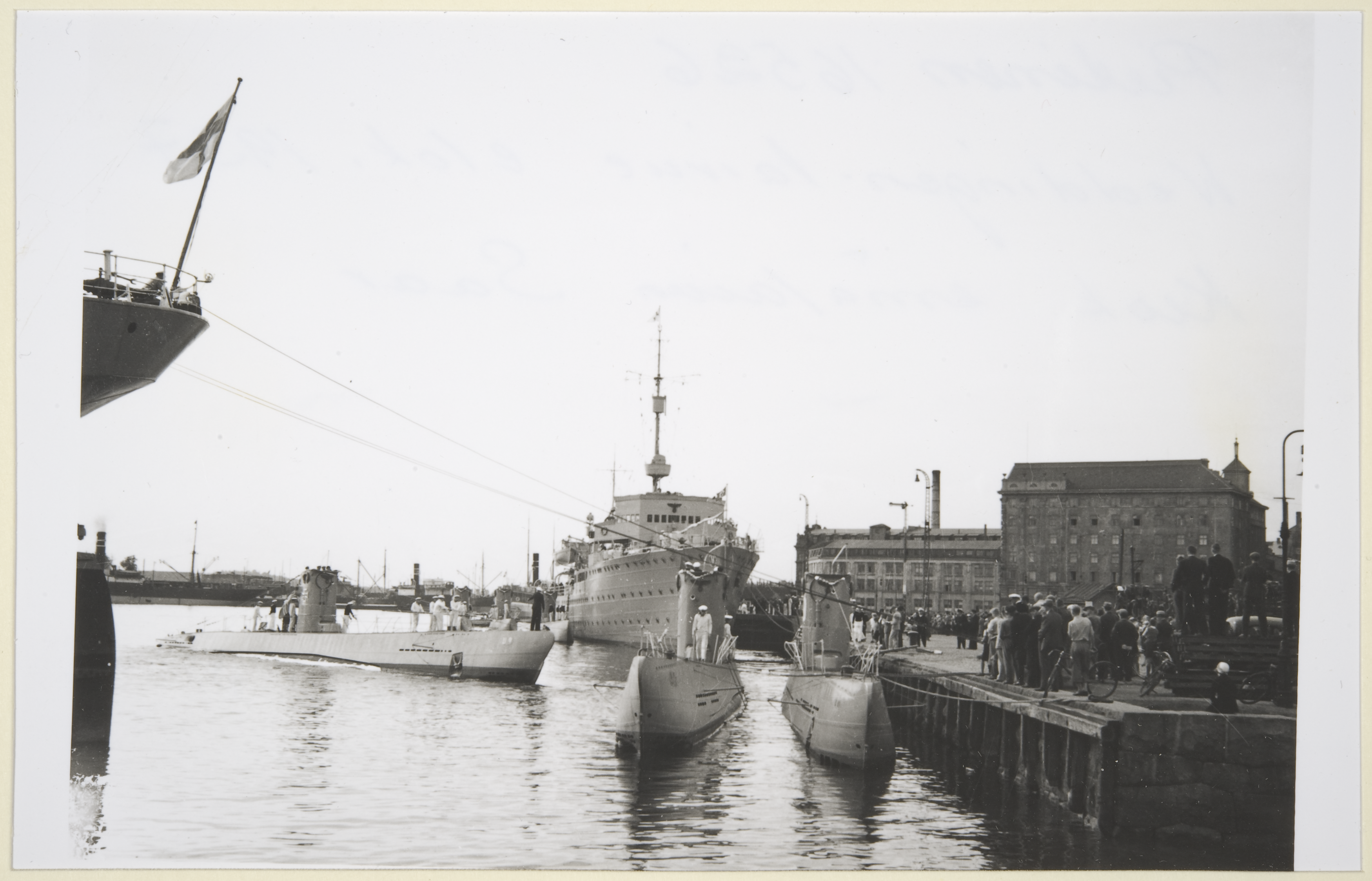
Weddigen flotilla on naval visit to Helsinki in 1937

== Flotilla commanders ==
Duration	Commander
September 1935 – October 1936	Kpt. z. S. Karl Dönitz
October 1936 – September 1937	Kpt. z. S. Otto Loycke
October 1937 – September 1939	Kptlt. Hans-Güther Looff
September 1939 – December 1939	Kptlt. Hans Eckermann m.d.F.b.
January 1940 – October 1940	K.Kapt. Hans Eckermann
November 1940 – February 1942	K.Kapt. Hans Cohausz
February 1942 – July 1942	Kptlt. Heinz Buchholz i.V.
July 1942 – September 1944	K.Kapt. Werner Winter

== U-boats assigned to the flotilla ==
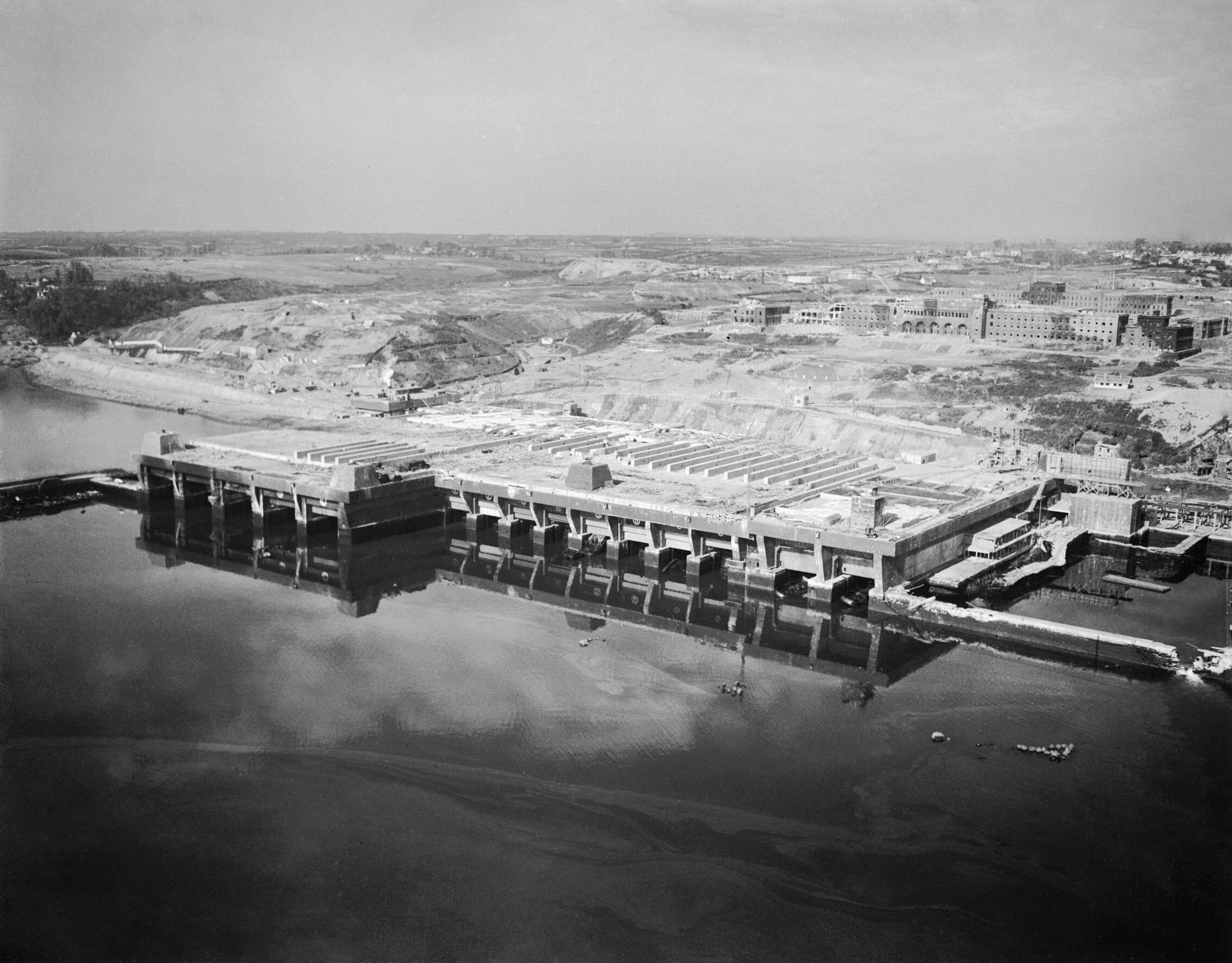
U-boat pens at Brest

U-7	U-8	U-9	U-10	U-11	U-12	U-13
U-14	U-15	U-16	U-17	U-18	U-19	U-20
U-21	U-22	U-23	U-24	U-56	U-57	U-58
U-59	U-60	U-61	U-62	U-63	U-79	U-80
U-81	U-83	U-84	U-86	U-116	U-117	U-137
U-138	U-139	U-140	U-141	U-142	U-143	U-144
U-145	U-146	U-147	U-149	U-150	U-201	U-202
U-203	U-204	U-208	U-209	U-213	U-225	U-238
U-243	U-247	U-263	U-268	U-271	U-276	U-292
U-301	U-304	U-305	U-306	U-311	U-331	U-336
U-353	U-354	U-371	U-372	U-374	U-379	U-392
U-394	U-396	U-401	U-405	U-413	U-415	U-418
U-422	U-424	U-426	U-435	U-439	U-440	U-441
U-456	U-471	U-556	U-557	U-558	U-559	U-561
U-562	U-563	U-564	U-565	U-566	U-574	U-582
U-584	U-597	U-599	U-603	U-625	U-628	U-629
U-632	U-637	U-643	U-651	U-653	U-654	U-656
U-665	U-669	U-722	U-731	U-732	U-736	U-740
U-741	U-743	U-754	U-767	U-773	U-821	U-925
U-956	U-963	U-987	U-1007	U-1199		
