= German submarine U-448 =

German world war II submarine

History

Nazi Germany
- Name: U-448
- Ordered: 6 August 1940
- Builder: Schichau-Werke, Danzig
- Yard number: 1508
- Laid down: 1 July 1941
- Launched: 23 May 1942
- Commissioned: 1 August 1942
- Fate: Sunk, on 14 April 1944

General characteristics
- Class & type: Type VIIC submarine
- Displacement: 769 tonnes (757 long tons) surfaced; 871 t (857 long tons) submerged
- Length: 67.10 m (220 ft 2 in) o/a; 50.50 m (165 ft 8 in) pressure hull
- Beam: 6.20 m (20 ft 4 in) o/a; 4.70 m (15 ft 5 in) pressure hull
- Height: 9.60 m (31 ft 6 in)
- Draught: 4.74 m (15 ft 7 in)
- Installed power: 2,800–3,200 PS (2,100–2,400 kW; 2,800–3,200 bhp) (diesels); 750 PS (550 kW; 740 shp) (electric)
- Propulsion: 2 shafts; 2 × diesel engines; 2 × electric motors
- Speed: 17.7 knots (32.8 km/h; 20.4 mph) surfaced; 7.6 knots (14.1 km/h; 8.7 mph) submerged
- Range: 8,500 nmi (15,700 km; 9,800 mi) at 10 knots (19 km/h; 12 mph) surfaced; 80 nmi (150 km; 92 mi) at 4 knots (7.4 km/h; 4.6 mph) submerged
- Test depth: 230 m (750 ft); Crush depth: 250–295 m (820–968 ft)
- Complement: 4 officers, 40–56 enlisted
- Armament: 5 × 53.3 cm (21 in) torpedo tubes (four bow, one stern); 14 × torpedoes; 1 × 8.8 cm (3.46 in) deck gun (220 rounds); 1 x 2 cm (0.79 in) C/30 AA gun

Service record
- Part of: 8th U-boat Flotilla; 1 August 1942 – 31 January 1943; 7th U-boat Flotilla; 1 February 1943 – 14 April 1944
- Identification codes: M 19 297
- Commanders: Oblt.z.S. Helmut Dauter; 1 August 1942 – 14 April 1944
- Operations: 4 patrols: 1st patrol: a. 30 January – 4 February 1943; b. 6 February – 25 March 1943; 2nd patrol: a. 17 April – 26 May 1943; b. 25 – 27 July 1943; c. 1 – 3 August 1943; 3rd patrol: a. 6 – 12 September 1943; b. 14 September – 3 November 1943; 4th patrol: 14 February – 14 April 1944
- Victories: None

German submarine U-448 was a Type VIIC U-boat of Nazi Germany's Kriegsmarine during World War II.

She carried out four patrols. She sank no ships.

She was a member of ten wolfpacks.

She was sunk by Allied warships, northeast of the Azores on 14 April 1944.

== Design ==
German Type VIIC submarines were preceded by the shorter Type VIIB submarines. U-448 had a displacement of 769 tonnes (757 long tons) when at the surface and 871 tonnes (857 long tons) while submerged. She had a total length of 67.10 m (220 ft 2 in), a pressure hull length of 50.50 m (165 ft 8 in), a beam of 6.20 m (20 ft 4 in), a height of 9.60 m (31 ft 6 in), and a draught of 4.74 m (15 ft 7 in). The submarine was powered by two Germaniawerft F46 four-stroke, six-cylinder supercharged diesel engines producing a total of 2,800 to 3,200 metric horsepower (2,060 to 2,350 kW; 2,760 to 3,160 shp) for use while surfaced, two AEG GU 460/8–27 double-acting electric motors producing a total of 750 metric horsepower (550 kW; 740 shp) for use while submerged. She had two shafts and two 1.23 m (4 ft) propellers. The boat was capable of operating at depths of up to 230 metres (750 ft).

The submarine had a maximum surface speed of 17.7 knots (32.8 km/h; 20.4 mph) and a maximum submerged speed of 7.6 knots (14.1 km/h; 8.7 mph). When submerged, the boat could operate for 80 nautical miles (150 km; 92 mi) at 4 knots (7.4 km/h; 4.6 mph); when surfaced, she could travel 8,500 nautical miles (15,700 km; 9,800 mi) at 10 knots (19 km/h; 12 mph). U-448 was fitted with five 53.3 cm (21 in) torpedo tubes (four fitted at the bow and one at the stern), fourteen torpedoes, one 8.8 cm (3.46 in) SK C/35 naval gun, 220 rounds, and a 2 cm (0.79 in) C/30 anti-aircraft gun. The boat had a complement of between forty-four and sixty.

== Service history ==
The submarine was laid down on 1 July 1941 at Schichau-Werke in Danzig (now Gdansk) as yard number 1508, launched on 23 May 1942 and commissioned on 1 August under the command of Oberleutnant zur See Helmut Dauter.

She served with the 8th U-boat Flotilla from 1 August 1942 for training and the 7th flotilla from 1 February 1943 for operations.

=== First patrol ===
U-432's first patrol was split in two and started with her departure from Kiel in Germany. She docked in Bergen in Norway at the end of the first part on 4 February 1943.

Part two began from Bergen on 6 February; she headed for the Atlantic Ocean via the gap separating the Iceland and Faroe. She arrived at St. Nazaire in occupied France on 25 March.

=== Second and third patrols ===
For her second sortie, she covered the area northwest of the Azores.

On her third foray, she was attacked southwest of Iceland by a Canadian Sunderland flying boat of No. 422 Squadron RCAF. The aircraft was also fired-at on its first run by U-281; the depth charges fell short. The aircraft crashed, five men died. U448 also suffered casualties – one dead and two men wounded. Due to the damage sustained, the boat was compelled to abort the patrol.

=== Fourth patrol and loss ===
Having left St. Nazaire on 14 February 1943, she travelled as far as the Denmark Strait (between Greenland and Iceland). The submarine's fourth sally was, at 61 days, her longest. On 14 April 1944, she was northeast of the Azores when she was sunk by depth charges from the Canadian frigate HMCS Swansea and the British sloop HMS Pelican.

Nine men went down with U-448; there were forty-two survivors.

=== Wolfpacks ===
U-448 took part in ten wolfpacks, namely:

- Neptun (18 – 28 February 1943)
- Wildfang (28 February – 5 March 1943)
- Westmark (6 – 7 March 1943)
- Amsel (22 April – 3 May 1943)
- Amsel 3 (3 – 6 May 1943)
- Rhein (7 – 10 May 1943)
- Elbe 2 (10 – 14 May 1943)
- Rossbach (24 September – 9 October 1943)
- Schlieffen (14 – 18 October 1943)
- Preussen (22 February – 14 March 1944)

== Bibliography ==
- Busch, Rainer; Röll, Hans-Joachim (1999). German U-boat commanders of World War II : a biographical dictionary. Translated by Brooks, Geoffrey. London, Annapolis, Md: Greenhill Books, Naval Institute Press. ISBN 1-55750-186-6.
- Busch, Rainer; Röll, Hans-Joachim (1999). Deutsche U-Boot-Verluste von September 1939 bis Mai 1945 [German U-boat losses from September 1939 to May 1945]. Der U-Boot-Krieg (in German). Vol. IV. Hamburg, Berlin, Bonn: Mittler. ISBN 3-8132-0514-2.
- Gröner, Erich; Jung, Dieter; Maass, Martin (1991). U-boats and Mine Warfare Vessels. German Warships 1815–1945. Vol. 2. Translated by Thomas, Keith; Magowan, Rachel. London: Conway Maritime Press. ISBN 0-85177-593-4.
- Kemp, Paul (1999). U-Boats Destroyed – German Submarine Losses in the World Wars. London: Arms & Armour. ISBN 1-85409-515-3.
