= HMCS Saint John =

River-class frigate of the Royal Canadian Navy

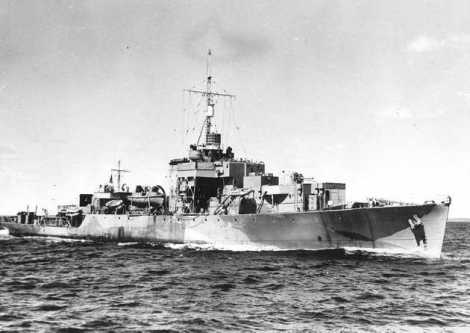
- HMCS Saint John

History

Canada
- Name: Saint John
- Namesake: Saint John, New Brunswick
- Operator: Royal Canadian Navy
- Ordered: October 1941
- Builder: Canadian Vickers Ltd. Montreal, Quebec
- Laid down: 28 May 1943
- Launched: 25 August 1943
- Commissioned: 13 December 1943
- Decommissioned: 27 November 1945
- Identification: pennant number: K 456
- Honours and awards: Atlantic 1944, English Channel 1944, Normandy 1944, North Sea 1945
- Fate: Sold, scrapped 1947

General characteristics
- Class & type: River-class frigate
- Displacement: 1,445 long tons (1,468 t; 1,618 short tons); 2,110 long tons (2,140 t; 2,360 short tons) (deep load)
- Length: 283 ft (86.26 m) p/p; 301.25 ft (91.82 m)o/a
- Beam: 36.5 ft (11.13 m)
- Draught: 9 ft (2.74 m); 13 ft (3.96 m) (deep load)
- Propulsion: 2 x Admiralty 3-drum boilers, 2 shafts, reciprocating vertical triple expansion, 5,500 ihp (4,100 kW)
- Speed: 20 knots (37.0 km/h); 20.5 knots (38.0 km/h) (turbine ships)
- Range: 646 long tons (656 t; 724 short tons) oil fuel; 7,500 nautical miles (13,890 km) at 15 knots (27.8 km/h)
- Complement: 157
- Armament: 2 × QF 4 in (102 mm) /45 Mk. XVI on twin mount HA/LA Mk.XIX; 1 × QF 12 pdr (3 in (76 mm)) 12 cwt /40 Mk. V on mounting HA/LA Mk.IX (not all ships); 8 × 20 mm QF Oerlikon A/A on twin mounts Mk.V; 1 × Hedgehog 24 spigot A/S projector; up to 150 depth charges

HMCS Saint John was a River-class frigate that served with the Royal Canadian Navy during the Second World War. She served primarily as a convoy escort in the Battle of the Atlantic. She was named for Saint John, New Brunswick.

Saint John was ordered in October 1941 as part of the 1942–1943 River-class building program. She was laid down on 28 May 1943 by Canadian Vickers Ltd. at Montreal, Quebec and launched 25 August later that year. She was commissioned into the Royal Canadian Navy on 13 December 1943 at Montreal.

== Background ==
The River-class frigate was designed by William Reed of Smith's Dock Company of South Bank-on-Tees. Originally called a "twin-screw corvette", its purpose was to improve on the convoy escort classes in service with the Royal Navy at the time, including the Flower-class corvette. The first orders were placed by the Royal Navy in 1940 and the vessels were named for rivers in the United Kingdom, giving name to the class. In Canada they were named for towns and cities though they kept the same designation. The name "frigate" was suggested by Vice-Admiral Percy Nelles of the Royal Canadian Navy and was adopted later that year.

Improvements over the corvette design included improved accommodation which was markedly better. The twin engines gave only three more knots of speed but extended the range of the ship to nearly double that of a corvette at 7,200 nautical miles (13,300 km) at 12 knots. Among other lessons applied to the design was an armament package better designed to combat U-boats including a twin 4-inch mount forward and 12-pounder aft. 15 Canadian frigates were initially fitted with a single 4-inch gun forward but with the exception of HMCS Valleyfield, they were all eventually upgraded to the double mount. For underwater targets, the River-class frigate was equipped with a Hedgehog anti-submarine mortar and depth charge rails aft and four side-mounted throwers.

River-class frigates were the first Royal Canadian Navy warships to carry the 147B Sword horizontal fan echo sonar transmitter in addition to the irregular ASDIC. This allowed the ship to maintain contact with targets even while firing unless a target was struck. Improved radar and direction-finding equipment improved the RCN's ability to find and track enemy submarines over the previous classes.

Canada originally ordered the construction of 33 frigates in October 1941. The design was too big for the shipyards on the Great Lakes so all the frigates built in Canada were built in dockyards along the west coast or along the St. Lawrence River. In all Canada ordered the construction of 60 frigates including ten for the Royal Navy that transferred two to the United States Navy.

== War service ==
After working up in Bermuda in January 1944, Saint John returned to Halifax where she was stationed for a while. In April 1944, she transferred to escort group EG 9 based out of Derry. She participated in Operation Neptune, the naval component of the Invasion of Normandy. On 1 September 1944, Saint John in tandem with HMCS Swansea, sank U-247 southeast of Land's End in the English Channel. The battle took twenty-four hours before wreckage came up to confirm the kill. In December 1944, she escorted two Russian convoys, JW 62 to Kola Inlet and RA 62 from. On 16 February 1945 she sank U-309 east of Moray Firth in Scotland.

On 27 February 1945, Saint John arrived at Cardiff to undergo repairs, which took until April to complete. After the repairs were completed, she sailed for Canada to undergo a tropicalization refit in preparation for service in the southern Pacific Ocean. This meant adding refrigeration, water-cooling capabilities and a change to her camouflage pattern. The refit began in May 1945 at Saint John and was completed in October of that year. She was paid off 27 November 1945 at Halifax and laid up in Bedford Basin. In 1947 she was sold for scrapping and taken to Sydney, Nova Scotia to be broken up.
