= Egret-class sloop =

1938 class of British sloops-of-war

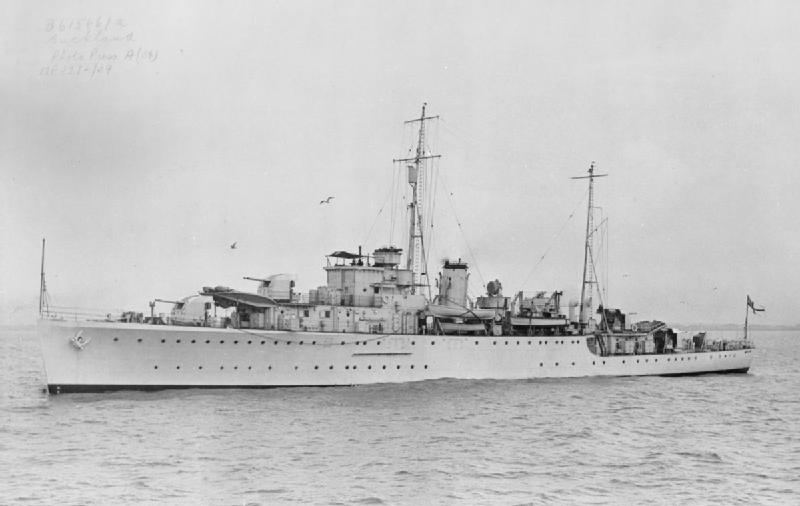
- HMS Auckland in January 1939

Class overview
- Name: Egret class
- Operators: Royal Navy
- Preceded by: Bittern class
- Succeeded by: Black Swan class
- In commission: 1938–1958
- Completed: 3
- Lost: 2
- Scrapped: 1

General characteristics
- Type: Sloop-of-war
- Displacement: 1,200 tons
- Length: 276 ft (84 m)
- Propulsion: Geared steam turbines on two shafts; 3,600 shp
- Speed: 19.25 knots (35.65 km/h; 22.15 mph)
- Complement: 188
- Armament: 8 × 4-inch (102 mm) (4 × 2); 4 × 0.5-inch (13 mm) (1 × 4)

The Egret-class sloops were a three ship class of a long-range escort vessels used in the Second World War by the Royal Navy. They were an enlarged version of the Bittern class with an extra twin 4-inch gun mounting. They were fitted with Denny Brown stabilisers and the Fuze Keeping Clock anti-aircraft fire control system.

== Ships ==
Ship	Builder	Laid Down	Launched	Fate
Auckland (ex-Heron)	William Denny and Brothers	16 June 1937	30 June 1938	Sunk 24 June 1941 by dive bombers near Tobruk
Pelican	John I. Thornycroft & Company	7 September 1937	12 September 1938	Broken up 1958
Egret	J. Samuel White	21 September 1937	31 May 1938	Sunk by guided bomb in Bay of Biscay 27 August 1943

== Service history ==
Three ships were built; HMS Auckland, HMS Pelican and HMS Egret. Auckland was lost on 24 June 1941, to 48 Junkers Ju 87 aircraft dive-bombing both her and HMAS Parramatta, off the coast of Tobruk. Pelican was an effective convoy escort, and was credited with the destruction of four U-boats. She survived until the end of the war, and was broken up in 1958. Egret was lost to a guided missile while patrolling in the Bay of Biscay. She was attacked by 18 Do 217 aircraft, one of which carried the Henschel Hs 293 guided bomb.
