= German submarine U-629 =

German World War II submarine

History

Nazi Germany
- Name: U-629
- Ordered: 15 August 1940
- Builder: Blohm & Voss, Hamburg
- Yard number: 605
- Laid down: 23 August 1941
- Launched: 12 May 1942
- Commissioned: 2 July 1942
- Fate: Sunk on 7 June 1944 in the English Channel, in position 48°34′N 05°23′W, by depth charges from an RAF Liberator.

General characteristics
- Class & type: Type VIIC submarine
- Displacement: 769 tonnes (757 long tons) surfaced; 871 t (857 long tons) submerged
- Length: 67.10 m (220 ft 2 in) o/a; 50.50 m (165 ft 8 in) pressure hull
- Beam: 6.20 m (20 ft 4 in) o/a; 4.70 m (15 ft 5 in) pressure hull
- Draught: 4.74 m (15 ft 7 in)
- Installed power: 2,800–3,200 PS (2,100–2,400 kW; 2,800–3,200 bhp) (diesels); 750 PS (550 kW; 740 shp) (electric)
- Propulsion: 2 shafts; 2 × diesel engines; 2 × electric motors
- Speed: 17.7 knots (32.8 km/h; 20.4 mph) surfaced; 7.6 knots (14.1 km/h; 8.7 mph) submerged
- Range: 8,500 nmi (15,700 km; 9,800 mi) at 10 knots (19 km/h; 12 mph) surfaced; 80 nmi (150 km; 92 mi) at 4 knots (7.4 km/h; 4.6 mph) submerged
- Test depth: 230 m (750 ft); Crush depth: 250–295 m (820–968 ft)
- Complement: 4 officers, 40–56 enlisted
- Armament: 5 × 53.3 cm (21 in) torpedo tubes (4 bow, 1 stern); 14 × torpedoes or 26 TMA mines; 1 × 8.8 cm (3.46 in) deck gun (220 rounds); 1 × twin 2 cm (0.79 in) C/30 anti-aircraft gun

Service record
- Part of: 5th U-boat Flotilla; 2 July – 30 November 1942; 11th U-boat Flotilla; 1 December 1942 – 31 October 1943; 1st U-boat Flotilla; 1 November 1943 – 7 June 1944
- Identification codes: M 07 337
- Commanders: Oblt.z.S. Hans-Helmuth Bugs; 2 July 1942 – 7 June 1944
- Operations: 11 patrols: 1st patrol: a. 23 December 1942 – 29 January 1943; b. 31 January – 3 February 1943; 2nd patrol: 24 February – 15 March 1943; 3rd patrol: a. 30 March – 29 April 1943; b. 3 – 7 July 1943; 4th patrol: a. 8 – 16 July 1943; b. 16 – 17 July 1943; c. 17 July 1943; 5th patrol: a. 19 – 31 July 1943; b. 4 – 6 August 1943; 6th patrol: a. 7 – 19 August 1943; b. 24 – 25 August 1943; 7th patrol: a. 26 August – 17 September 1943; b. 18 – 21 September 1943; 8th patrol: 22 November 1943 – 5 January 1944; 9th patrol: 5 – 7 March 1944; 10th patrol: 9 – 15 March 1944; 11th patrol: 6 – 7 June 1944
- Victories: None

German submarine U-629 was a Type VIIC U-boat built for Nazi Germany's Kriegsmarine for service during World War II. She was laid down on 23 August 1941 by Blohm & Voss, Hamburg as yard number 605, launched on 12 May 1942 and commissioned on 2 July 1942 under Oberleutnant zur See Hans-Helmuth Bugs.

== Design ==
German Type VIIC submarines were preceded by the shorter Type VIIB submarines. U-629 had a displacement of 769 tonnes (757 long tons) when at the surface and 871 tonnes (857 long tons) while submerged. She had a total length of 67.10 m (220 ft 2 in), a pressure hull length of 50.50 m (165 ft 8 in), a beam of 6.20 m (20 ft 4 in), a height of 9.60 m (31 ft 6 in), and a draught of 4.74 m (15 ft 7 in). The submarine was powered by two Germaniawerft F46 four-stroke, six-cylinder supercharged diesel engines producing a total of 2,800 to 3,200 metric horsepower (2,060 to 2,350 kW; 2,760 to 3,160 shp) for use while surfaced, two BBC GG UB 720/8 double-acting electric motors producing a total of 750 metric horsepower (550 kW; 740 shp) for use while submerged. She had two shafts and two 1.23 m (4 ft) propellers. The boat was capable of operating at depths of up to 230 metres (750 ft).

The submarine had a maximum surface speed of 17.7 knots (32.8 km/h; 20.4 mph) and a maximum submerged speed of 7.6 knots (14.1 km/h; 8.7 mph). When submerged, the boat could operate for 80 nautical miles (150 km; 92 mi) at 4 knots (7.4 km/h; 4.6 mph); when surfaced, she could travel 8,500 nautical miles (15,700 km; 9,800 mi) at 10 knots (19 km/h; 12 mph). U-629 was fitted with five 53.3 cm (21 in) torpedo tubes (four fitted at the bow and one at the stern), fourteen torpedoes, one 8.8 cm (3.46 in) SK C/35 naval gun, 220 rounds, and one twin 2 cm (0.79 in) C/30 anti-aircraft gun. The boat had a complement of between forty-four and sixty.

== Service history ==
The boat's career began with training at 5th U-boat Flotilla on 2 July 1942, followed by active service on 1 December 1942 as part of the 11th Flotilla. After eleven months she transferred to 1st Flotilla and stayed for the remainder of her service. In 11 patrols she sank no ships. During the eight patrol, on 4 January 1944 she was strafed and damaged in the Bay of Biscay by Wellington bomber from No. 304 Polish Bomber Squadron, but managed to return to Brest.

=== Wolfpacks ===
U-629 took part in seven wolfpacks, namely:

- Nordwind (24 – 28 January 1943)
- Nordwind (31 January – 2 February 1943)
- Taifun (2 – 4 April 1943)
- Coronel (4 – 8 December 1943)
- Coronel 1 (8 – 14 December 1943)
- Coronel 2 (14 – 17 December 1943)
- Amrum (18 – 23 December 1943)

=== Fate ===
U-629 was sunk on 7 June 1944 in the English Channel in position 48°34′N 05°23′W, by depth charges from an RAF Liberator of 53 Squadron. All hands were lost.

== Bibliography ==
- Busch, Rainer; Röll, Hans-Joachim (1999). German U-boat commanders of World War II: a biographical dictionary. Translated by Brooks, Geoffrey. London, Annapolis, Md: Greenhill Books, Naval Institute Press. ISBN 1-55750-186-6.
- Busch, Rainer; Röll, Hans-Joachim (1999). Der U-Boot-Krieg, 1939-1945: Deutsche U-Boot-Verluste von September 1939 bis Mai 1945 [German U-boat losses from September 1939 to May 1945] (in German). Vol. IV. Hamburg, Berlin, Bonn: Mittler. ISBN 3-8132-0514-2.
- Gröner, Eric; Jung, Dieter; Maass, Martin (1991). German Warships 1815-1945: U-boats and Mine Warfare Vessels. Vol. 2. Translated by Thomas, Keith; Magowan, Rachel. London: Conway Maritime Press. ISBN 0-85177-593-4.
- Sharpe, Peter (1998). U-Boat Fact File. Great Britain: Midland Publishing. ISBN 1-85780-072-9.
