= German submarine U-247 =

German World War II submarine

Coordinates: 49°54′N 5°49′W

History

Nazi Germany
- Name: U-247
- Ordered: 5 June 1941
- Builder: Germaniawerft, Kiel
- Yard number: 681
- Laid down: 16 December 1942
- Launched: 23 September 1943
- Commissioned: 23 October 1943
- Fate: Sunk 1 September 1944

General characteristics
- Class & type: Type VIIC submarine
- Displacement: 769 tonnes (757 long tons) surfaced; 871 t (857 long tons) submerged
- Length: 67.23 m (220 ft 7 in) o/a; 50.50 m (165 ft 8 in) pressure hull
- Beam: 6.20 m (20 ft 4 in) o/a; 4.70 m (15 ft 5 in) pressure hull
- Height: 9.60 m (31 ft 6 in)
- Draught: 4.74 m (15 ft 7 in)
- Installed power: 2,800–3,200 PS (2,100–2,400 kW; 2,800–3,200 bhp) (diesels); 750 PS (550 kW; 740 shp) (electric)
- Propulsion: 2 shafts; 2 × diesel engines; 2 × electric motors
- Speed: 17.7 knots (32.8 km/h; 20.4 mph) surfaced; 7.6 knots (14.1 km/h; 8.7 mph) submerged
- Range: 8,500 nmi (15,700 km; 9,800 mi) at 10 knots (19 km/h; 12 mph) surfaced; 80 nmi (150 km; 92 mi) at 4 knots (7.4 km/h; 4.6 mph) submerged
- Test depth: 230 m (750 ft); Crush depth: 250–295 m (820–968 ft)
- Complement: 4 officers, 40–56 enlisted
- Armament: 5 × 53.3 cm (21 in) torpedo tubes (four bow, one stern); 14 × torpedoes or 26 TMA mines; 1 × 3.7 cm (1.5 in) Flak M42 AA gun; 2 × twin 2 cm (0.79 in) C/30 anti-aircraft guns

Service record
- Part of: 5th U-boat Flotilla; 23 October 1943 – 31 May 1944; 1st U-boat Flotilla; 1 June – 1 September 1944
- Identification codes: M 53 355
- Commanders: Oblt.z.S. Gerhard Matschulat; 23 October 1943 – 1 September 1944
- Operations: 2 patrols: 1st patrol: 31 May – 28 July 1944; 2nd patrol: 26 August – 1 September 1944
- Victories: 1 merchant ship sunk (207 GRT}

German submarine U-247 was a Type VIIC U-boat of Nazi Germany's Kriegsmarine during World War II. The submarine was laid down on 16 December 1942 at the Friedrich Krupp Germaniawerft yard at Kiel as yard number 681, launched on 23 September 1943 and commissioned on 23 October under the command of Oberleutnant zur See Gerhard Matschulat.

In two patrols, she sank one ship of 207 GRT.

She was sunk by Canadian warships on 1 September 1944.

== Design ==
German Type VIIC submarines were preceded by the shorter Type VIIB submarines. U-247 had a displacement of 769 tonnes (757 long tons) when at the surface and 871 tonnes (857 long tons) while submerged. She had a total length of 67.10 m (220 ft 2 in), a pressure hull length of 50.50 m (165 ft 8 in), a beam of 6.20 m (20 ft 4 in), a height of 9.60 m (31 ft 6 in), and a draught of 4.74 m (15 ft 7 in). The submarine was powered by two Germaniawerft F46 four-stroke, six-cylinder supercharged diesel engines producing a total of 2,800 to 3,200 metric horsepower (2,060 to 2,350 kW; 2,760 to 3,160 shp) for use while surfaced, two AEG GU 460/8–27 double-acting electric motors producing a total of 750 metric horsepower (550 kW; 740 shp) for use while submerged. She had two shafts and two 1.23 m (4 ft) propellers. The boat was capable of operating at depths of up to 230 metres (750 ft).

The submarine had a maximum surface speed of 17.7 knots (32.8 km/h; 20.4 mph) and a maximum submerged speed of 7.6 knots (14.1 km/h; 8.7 mph). When submerged, the boat could operate for 80 nautical miles (150 km; 92 mi) at 4 knots (7.4 km/h; 4.6 mph); when surfaced, she could travel 8,500 nautical miles (15,700 km; 9,800 mi) at 10 knots (19 km/h; 12 mph). U-247 was fitted with five 53.3 cm (21 in) torpedo tubes (four fitted at the bow and one at the stern), fourteen torpedoes, one 3.7 cm (1.5 in) Flak M42 and two twin 2 cm (0.79 in) C/30 anti-aircraft guns. The boat had a complement of between forty-four and sixty.

== Service history ==
After training with the 5th U-boat Flotilla at Kiel, U-247 was transferred to the 1st flotilla for front-line service on 23 October 1943.

=== First patrol ===
The boat's first patrol was preceded by a short trip between Kiel in Germany, and Arendal and Bergen in Norway. Her first sortie began with her departure from Bergen on 31 May 1944. She passed into the Atlantic Ocean via the gap between the Faroe and Shetland Islands. She sank the Noreen Mary on 5 July west of Scotland, with gunfire, not torpedoes, which was quite remarkable by this stage of the war, with a near constant Allied air presence so close to the British coast. It is alleged that her crew then machine-gunned survivors of the fishing boat in the water, only one of two cases believed to have substance to the claim (see also U-852). She then skirted to the west of Ireland, before arriving at Brest in occupied France, on 27 July.

=== Second patrol and loss ===
The boat had left Brest on 26 August 1944. Patrolling near Lands End, at the western end of the English Channel, she was attacked and sunk on 1 September by depth charges from the Canadian frigates HMCS Saint John and HMCS Swansea. Fifty-two men died; there were no survivors.

== Summary of raiding history ==
Date	Ship Name	Nationality	Tonnage (GRT)	Fate
5 July 1944	Noreen Mary	United Kingdom	207	Sunk

== Bibliography ==
- Bridgland, Tony (2002). Waves of Hate. London: Leo Cooper. ISBN 0-85052-822-4.
- Busch, Rainer; Röll, Hans-Joachim (1999). German U-boat commanders of World War II : a biographical dictionary. Translated by Brooks, Geoffrey. London, Annapolis, Md: Greenhill Books, Naval Institute Press. ISBN 1-55750-186-6.
- Gröner, Erich; Jung, Dieter; Maass, Martin (1991). U-boats and Mine Warfare Vessels. German Warships 1815–1945. Vol. 2. Translated by Thomas, Keith; Magowan, Rachel. London: Conway Maritime Press. ISBN 0-85177-593-4.
- Kemp, Paul (1999). U-Boats Destroyed – German Submarine Losses in the World Wars. London: Arms & Armour. ISBN 1-85409-515-3.
