= German submarine U-243 =

German World War II submarine

Coordinates: 47°06′N 6°40′W

- U-243 under attack by a Sunderland of No. 10 Squadron RAAF

History

Nazi Germany
- Name: U-243
- Ordered: 10 April 1941
- Builder: Germaniawerft, Kiel
- Yard number: 677
- Laid down: 28 October 1942
- Launched: 2 September 1943
- Commissioned: 2 October 1943
- Fate: Sunk on 8 July 1944 in the Bay of Biscay

General characteristics
- Class & type: Type VIIC submarine
- Displacement: 769 tonnes (757 long tons) surfaced; 871 t (857 long tons) submerged
- Length: 67.10 m (220 ft 2 in) o/a; 50.50 m (165 ft 8 in) pressure hull
- Beam: 6.20 m (20 ft 4 in) o/a; 4.70 m (15 ft 5 in) pressure hull
- Height: 9.60 m (31 ft 6 in)
- Draught: 4.72 m (15 ft 6 in)
- Installed power: 2,800–3,200 PS (2,100–2,400 kW; 2,800–3,200 bhp) (diesels); 750 PS (550 kW; 740 shp) (electric)
- Propulsion: 2 shafts; 2 × diesel engines; 2 × electric motors
- Speed: 17.7 knots (32.8 km/h; 20.4 mph) surfaced; 7.6 knots (14.1 km/h; 8.7 mph) submerged
- Range: 8,500 nmi (15,700 km; 9,800 mi) at 10 knots (19 km/h; 12 mph) surfaced; 80 nmi (150 km; 92 mi) at 4 knots (7.4 km/h; 4.6 mph) submerged
- Test depth: 230 m (750 ft); Calculated crush depth: 250–295 m (820–968 ft)
- Complement: 4 officer, 40-48 enlisted
- Armament: 5 × 53.3 cm (21 in) torpedo tubes (four bow, one stern); 14 × torpedoes or 26 TMA mines; 1 × 8.8 cm (3.46 in) deck gun (220 rounds); 1 × 3.7 cm (1.5 in) Flak M42 AA gun; 2 × twin 2 cm (0.79 in) C/30 anti-aircraft guns

Service record
- Part of: 5th U-boat Flotilla; 2 October 1943 – 31 May 1944; 1st U-boat Flotilla; 1 June – 8 July 1944
- Identification codes: M 54 310
- Commanders: Oblt.z.S. / Kptlt. Hans Märtens; 2 October 1943 – 8 July 1944
- Operations: 1 patrol: a. 8 – 12 June 1944; b. 15 June – 8 July 1944
- Victories: None

German submarine U-243 was a Type VIIC U-boat of Nazi Germany's Kriegsmarine during World War II.

An order was placed for U-243 on 10 April 1941 and construction began on 28 October 1942 at Friedrich Krupp Germaniawerft, Kiel, as yard number 677. She was launched the following year on 2 September 1943 and commissioned on 2 October 1943 under the command of Oberleutnant zur See Hans Märtens. Three days into her only patrol, she shot a German aircraft down.

She was sunk in the Bay of Biscay on 8 July 1944.

== Design ==
German Type VIIC submarines were preceded by the shorter Type VIIB submarines. U-243 had a displacement of 769 tonnes (757 long tons) when at the surface and 871 tonnes (857 long tons) while submerged. She had a total length of 67.10 m (220 ft 2 in), a pressure hull length of 50.50 m (165 ft 8 in), a beam of 6.20 m (20 ft 4 in), a height of 9.60 m (31 ft 6 in), and a draught of 4.74 m (15 ft 7 in). The submarine was powered by two Germaniawerft F46 four-stroke, six-cylinder supercharged diesel engines producing a total of 2,800 to 3,200 metric horsepower (2,060 to 2,350 kW; 2,760 to 3,160 shp) for use while surfaced, two AEG GU 460/8–27 double-acting electric motors producing a total of 750 metric horsepower (550 kW; 740 shp) for use while submerged. She had two shafts and two 1.23 m (4 ft) propellers. The boat was capable of operating at depths of up to 230 metres (750 ft).

The submarine had a maximum surface speed of 17.7 knots (32.8 km/h; 20.4 mph) and a maximum submerged speed of 7.6 knots (14.1 km/h; 8.7 mph). When submerged, the boat could operate for 80 nautical miles (150 km; 92 mi) at 4 knots (7.4 km/h; 4.6 mph); when surfaced, she could travel 8,500 nautical miles (15,700 km; 9,800 mi) at 10 knots (19 km/h; 12 mph). U-243 was fitted with five 53.3 cm (21 in) torpedo tubes (four fitted at the bow and one at the stern), fourteen torpedoes, one 8.8 cm (3.46 in) SK C/35 naval gun, (220 rounds), one 3.7 cm (1.5 in) Flak M42 and two twin 2 cm (0.79 in) C/30 anti-aircraft guns. The boat had a complement of between forty-four and sixty.

== Service history ==
Her only patrol was preceded by a short voyage from Kiel to Flekkefjord in southern Norway in May 1944. On 11 June 1944, she mistakenly shot down a German Junkers Ju 88 aircraft 40 nautical miles (74 km; 46 mi) southwest of Bergen while making for that city.

She passed through the gap between Iceland and the Faroe Islands and steamed south, heading for the French Atlantic ports.

She was attacked and sunk by a Sunderland flying boat of No. 10 Squadron RAAF in the Bay of Biscay on 8 July 1944. Eleven men died; there were 38 survivors.

== See also ==
- Battle of the Atlantic

== Bibliography ==
- Busch, Rainer; Röll, Hans-Joachim (1999). German U-boat commanders of World War II : a biographical dictionary. Translated by Brooks, Geoffrey. London, Annapolis, Md: Greenhill Books, Naval Institute Press. ISBN 1-55750-186-6.
- Busch, Rainer; Röll, Hans-Joachim (1999). Deutsche U-Boot-Verluste von September 1939 bis Mai 1945 [German U-boat losses from September 1939 to May 1945]. Der U-Boot-Krieg (in German). Vol. IV. Hamburg, Berlin, Bonn: Mittler. ISBN 3-8132-0514-2.
- Gröner, Erich; Jung, Dieter; Maass, Martin (1991). U-boats and Mine Warfare Vessels. German Warships 1815–1945. Vol. 2. Translated by Thomas, Keith; Magowan, Rachel. London: Conway Maritime Press. ISBN 0-85177-593-4.
- Kemp, Paul (1999). U-Boats Destroyed - German Submarine Losses in the World Wars. London: Arms & Armour. ISBN 1-85409-515-3.
- Williamson, Gordon; Palmer, Ian (2002). Kriegsmarine U-boats 1939-45: Vol 2. Osprey. ISBN 1-84176-364-0.
