= HMCS Swansea =

Canadian River-class frigate

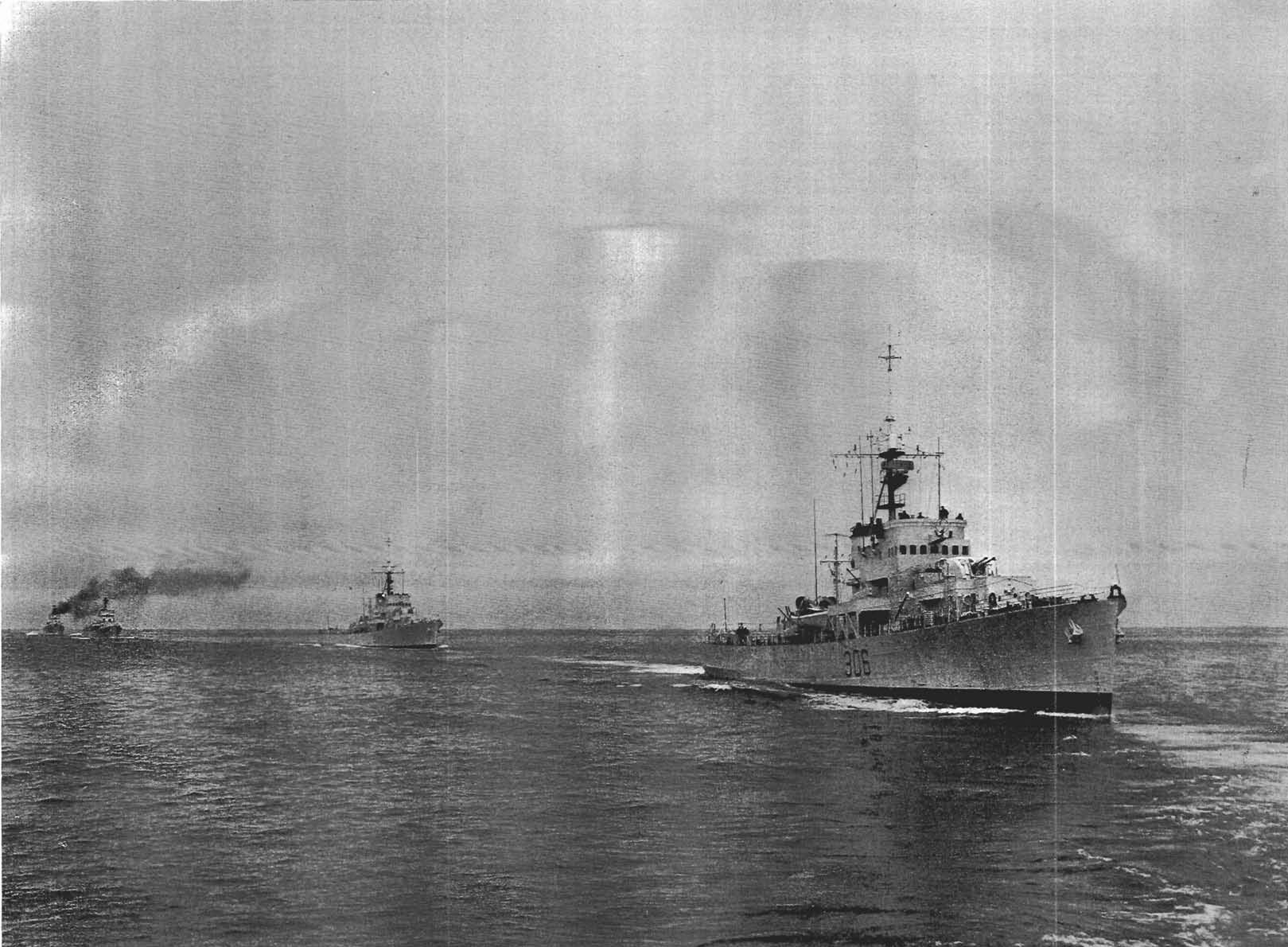
- HMCS Swansea after conversion to ocean escort

History

Canada
- Name: Swansea
- Namesake: Swansea, Ontario
- Ordered: October 1941
- Builder: Yarrows Ltd., Esquimalt
- Yard number: 83
- Laid down: 15 July 1942
- Launched: 19 December 1942
- Commissioned: 4 October 1943
- Decommissioned: 2 November 1945
- Identification: Pennant number: K328
- Recommissioned: 12 April 1948
- Decommissioned: 14 October 1966
- Reclassified: Prestonian-class frigate
- Identification: Pennant number: 328
- Motto: Floreat Swansea (Let Swansea flourish)
- Honours and awards: Atlantic 1943–44, Normandy 1944, English Channel 1944
- Fate: Sold August 1967, broken up Savona, Italy 1967
- Badge: Azure in a base barry wavy of four argent and azure out of which a swan with wings displayed argent and holding in its beak or a maple leaf gules.

General characteristics
- Class & type: River-class frigate
- Displacement: 1,445 long tons (1,468 t; 1,618 short tons); 2,110 long tons (2,140 t; 2,360 short tons) (deep load)
- Length: 283 ft (86.26 m) p/p; 301.25 ft (91.82 m)o/a
- Beam: 36.5 ft (11.13 m)
- Draught: 9 ft (2.74 m); 13 ft (3.96 m) (deep load)
- Propulsion: 2 x Admiralty 3-drum boilers, 2 shafts, reciprocating vertical triple expansion, 5,500 ihp (4,100 kW)
- Speed: 20 knots (37.0 km/h); 20.5 knots (38.0 km/h) (turbine ships)
- Range: 646 long tons (656 t; 724 short tons) oil fuel; 7,500 nautical miles (13,890 km) at 15 knots (27.8 km/h)
- Complement: 157
- Armament: 2 × QF 4 in (102 mm)/45 Mk. XVI on twin mount HA/LA Mk.XIX; 1 × QF 12 pdr (3 in (76 mm)) 12 cwt /40 Mk. V on mounting HA/LA Mk.IX (not all ships); 8 × 20 mm QF Oerlikon A/A on twin mounts Mk.V; 1 × Hedgehog 24 spigot A/S projector; up to 150 depth charges

HMCS Swansea was a Canadian River-class frigate that was the most successful U-boat hunter in the Royal Canadian Navy during the Second World War, having a hand in the destruction of four of them. She saw service in the Battle of the Atlantic from 1943 to 1945. Following the war she was refit as a Prestonian-class frigate. She is named for Swansea, Ontario.

Swansea was ordered in October 1941 as part of the 1942–1943 building program. She was laid down on 15 July 1942 by Yarrows Ltd. at Esquimalt and launched 19 December 1942. Swansea was commissioned into the RCN at Victoria, British Columbia, on 4 October 1943 with the pennant K328.

== Background ==
The River-class frigate was designed by William Reed of Smith's Dock Company of South Bank-on-Tees. Originally called a "twin-screw corvette", its purpose was to improve on the convoy escort classes in service with the Royal Navy at the time, including the Flower-class corvette. The first orders were placed by the Royal Navy in 1940 and the vessels were named for rivers in the United Kingdom, giving name to the class. In Canada they were named for towns and cities, though they kept the same designation. The name "frigate" was suggested by Vice-Admiral Percy Nelles of the Royal Canadian Navy and was adopted later that year.

Improvements over the corvette design included improved accommodation, which was markedly better. The twin engines gave only three more knots of speed, but extended the range of the ship to nearly double that of a corvette (7,200 nautical miles [13,300 km] at 12 knots). Among other lessons applied to the design was an armament package better designed to combat U-boats, including a twin 4-inch mount forward and 12-pounder aft. 15 Canadian frigates were initially fitted with a single 4-inch gun forward, but with the exception of HMCS Valleyfield, all were eventually upgraded to the double mount. For underwater targets, the River-class frigate was equipped with a Hedgehog anti-submarine mortar, depth charge rails aft, and four side-mounted throwers.

River-class frigates were the first Royal Canadian Navy warships to carry the 147B Sword horizontal fan echo sonar transmitter in addition to the irregular ASDIC. This allowed the ship to maintain contact with targets even while firing, unless a target was struck. Improved radar and direction-finding equipment improved the RCN's ability to find and track enemy submarines over the previous classes.

Canada originally ordered the construction of 33 frigates in October 1941. The design was too big for the shipyards on the Great Lakes, so all the frigates built in Canada were constructed in dockyards along the west coast or along the St. Lawrence River. In all, Canada ordered the construction of 60 frigates including ten for the Royal Navy, which transferred two to the United States Navy.

== Service history ==
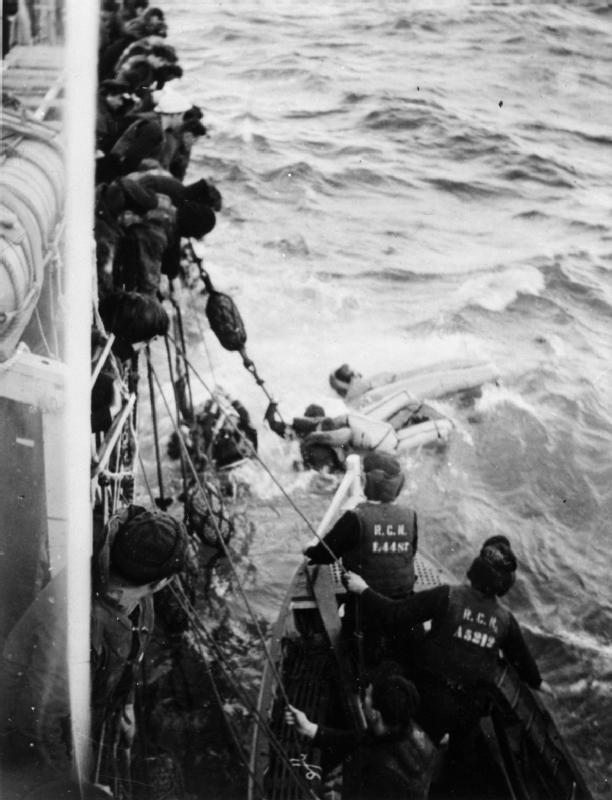
Swansea rescuing survivors from U-448.

Swansea arrived at Halifax on 16 November 1943 and worked up off Pictou, Nova Scotia. She was assigned to escort group EG 9 at Derry. On her way to joining her new group, she took part in the sinking of U-845 alongside HMS Forester, HMCS St. Laurent, and HMCS Owen Sound on 10 March 1944. After sinking the submarine, Swansea, Forester, and St. Laurent stopped to pick up survivors from the sunken submarine, capturing 45 German sailors between them. On 14 April, having joined her group, she took part in the sinking of U-448 northeast of the Azores, this time aided by HMS Pelican. Swansea rescued 17 German sailors from the sinking submarine this time. Eight days later, on 22 April 1944, this time with HMCS Matane, Swansea sank U-311 southwest of Iceland. This kill was only awarded long after the war once the records of German and British intelligence became available.

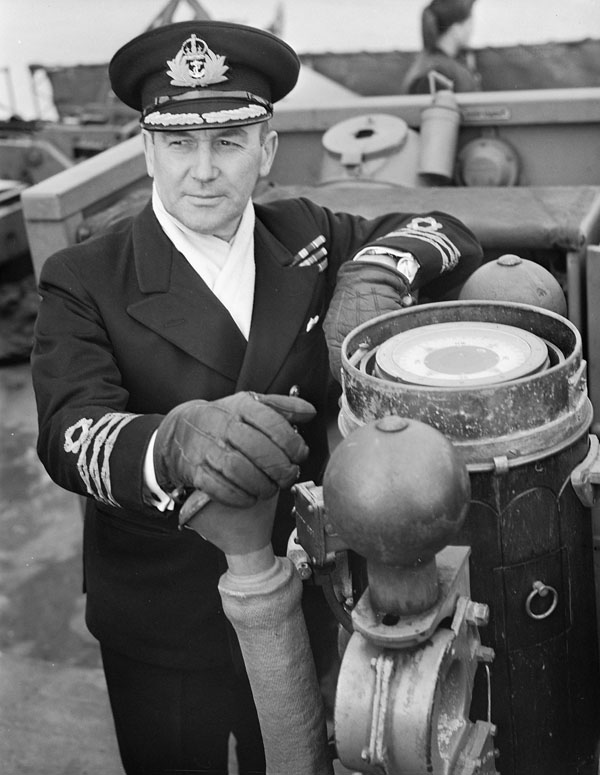
Commander Clarence Aubrey King of Swansea

Swansea was then assigned to Operation Neptune, the naval aspect of the invasion of Normandy by Allied forces. She was present on D-day, 6 June 1944, and for the next four months patrolled the English Channel in support of the invasion. During this period, Swansea sank U-247 off Land's End in tandem with HMCS Saint John on 1 September 1944. She returned to Canada in November 1944 for tropicalisation refit, which began in December at Liverpool, Nova Scotia, in preparation for service in the Pacific Ocean. The refit was completed in July 1945, the first to do so, and Swansea was assessing the results in the Caribbean Sea when news of the surrender of Japan broke. Swansea was paid off 2 November 1945 into the reserve at Bedford Basin.

=== Postwar service ===
After the war, Swansea was twice recommissioned between April 1948 and November 1953 for training cadets. In August–September 1949, Swansea sailed north to Baffin Island, making several port visits including Godthaab, capital city of Greenland. This was the farthest north a Royal Canadian Naval ship had travelled. On 15 September, while sailing south along the coast of Labrador, Swansea was ordered to the aid of the stricken supply vessel Malahat near Mansel Island in Hudson Bay. Arriving on 18 September, Swansea took Malahat under tow and brought the supply vessel to Goose Bay, Newfoundland, nearly 1,200 nautical miles (2,200 km; 1,400 mi). Swansea left the damaged ship there and proceeded to Halifax. In May 1951, Crescent, La Hulloise and Swansea sailed to the United Kingdom on a training cruise. In January 1952, the frigate made a three-week training cruise to the Caribbean Sea, visiting Nassau, Bahamas, and Groton, Connecticut. In May 1952, with Crescent and La Hulloise, the frigate made a training cruise to Gibraltar and the French Riviera. On 15 June 1953 she attended the Coronation of Queen Elizabeth II Fleet Review at Spithead.

From 1956 to 1957, Swansea underwent conversion to a Prestonian-class ocean escort. This meant a flush-decked appearance, with a larger bridge and taller funnel. Her hull forward was strengthened against ice and the quarterdeck was enclosed to contain two Squid anti-submarine mortars. Swansea was recommissioned 14 November 1957 with pennant number 306. She served primarily on the east coast. In 1961, the frigate was a member of the Ninth Canadian Escort Squadron. She was paid off 14 October 1966 and was sold for scrap and broken up at Savona, Italy, in 1967.

== See also ==
- List of River class frigates
- German submarine U-448
- German submarine U-311
- German submarine U-247
