= HMS Auckland (L61) =

Sloop of the Royal Navy

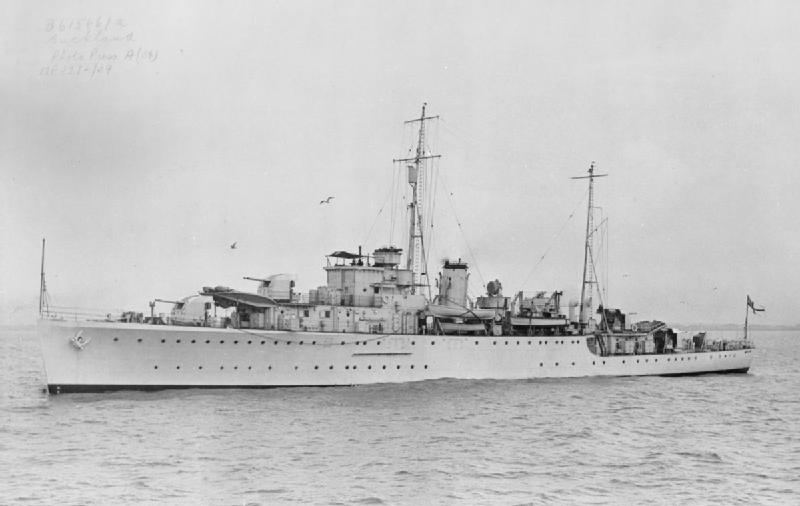
- Auckland in January 1939

History

United Kingdom
- Name: Auckland
- Builder: Denny of Dumbarton, Scotland
- Laid down: 16 June 1937
- Launched: 30 June 1938
- Commissioned: 16 November 1938
- Identification: Pennant number: L61
- Fate: Sunk 24 June 1941

General characteristics
- Class & type: Egret-class sloop
- Displacement: 1,200 tons
- Length: 276 ft (84 m)
- Propulsion: Geared steam turbines on two shafts; 3,600 shp (2,700 kW)
- Speed: 19.25 knots (35.65 km/h; 22.15 mph)
- Complement: 188
- Armament: 8 × 4-inch (102 mm) (4 × 2); 4 × 0.5-inch (13 mm) (1 × 4)

HMS Auckland (L61) was an Egret-class sloop built for the British Royal Navy. She was active during the Second World War and was employed as a convoy escort and anti-submarine warfare vessel. Auckland was sunk in an air attack in the eastern Mediterranean in June 1941.

== Construction ==
Auckland was ordered on 5 March 1937 from William Denny and Brothers, of Dumbarton, as part of the 1936 construction programme, and was laid down there on 16 June 1937. Originally named Heron, she was renamed Auckland when launched on 30 June 1938. She was designed as a general-purpose vessel, and intended for use as a survey ship around New Zealand. However, with the approach of war, Auckland was modified during her construction for service as a convoy escort and anti-submarine warfare ship. She was completed on 16 November 1938.

== Service history ==
At the outbreak of the Second World War, Auckland was stationed at Simonstown in South Africa. She was briefly employed in hunting for raiders in the South Atlantic before returning to the UK with convoy SL 9.

In January 1940 Auckland was stationed at Rosyth, serving as escort to east coast convoys in the North Sea.

In April Auckland took part in Operation Primrose, a planned landing in Norway, and later assisted in the evacuation of troops from Namsos and Andalsnes.

In May Auckland was transferred to the Mediterranean for service in the Red Sea. After a refit she served as a convoy escort in the Red Sea, and in October was involved in the Attack on Convoy BN 7. After a further refit in January 1941 Auckland joined the Mediterranean fleet. In April she was involved in an action in the Kasos strait, defending a troop convoy against an attack by Italian destroyers. In May she was escorting convoys to Tobruk, which was under siege by Axis forces in North Africa.

== Fate ==
On 24 June 1941 Auckland was in company with Australian sloop HMAS Parramatta, escorting the oiler Pass of Balmaha to Tobruk. In the evening of 24 June they were attacked by Axis aircraft. Auckland was hit several times and wrecked; her crew abandoned ship and she sank, with the loss of 36 of her 198 crew. Most of the 162 survivors from her crew were saved by Parramatta.
