= HMS Pelican (L86) =

Sloop of the Royal Navy

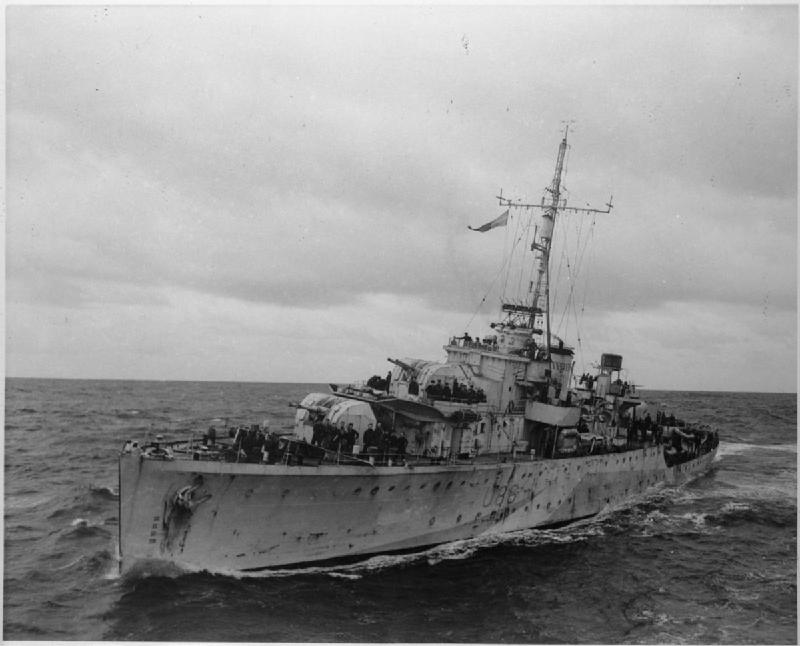
- HMS Pelican in 1944

History

United Kingdom
- Name: Pelican
- Builder: Thornycroft, Woolston
- Laid down: 7 September 1937
- Launched: 12 September 1938
- Commissioned: 2 March 1939
- Identification: Pennant number: L86, later U86, B294 British Pacific Fleet, F86 post war
- Fate: Scrapped, 1958

General characteristics
- Class & type: Egret-class sloop
- Displacement: 1,200 tons
- Length: 276 ft (84 m)
- Propulsion: Geared steam turbines on two shafts; 3,600 shp (2,700 kW)
- Speed: 19.25 knots (35.65 km/h; 22.15 mph)
- Complement: 188
- Armament: 8 × 4-inch (102 mm) (4 × 2); 4 × 0.5-inch (13 mm) (1 × 4)

HMS Pelican (L86) was an Egret-class sloop, built for the British Royal Navy. She was active during the Second World War and was a successful anti-submarine warfare vessel, being credited with the destruction of four U-boats.

== Construction ==
Pelican was ordered on 19 March 1937 under the 1937 Building programme from JI Thornycroft at Woolston, Hampshire. She was laid down on 7 September 1937, launched on 12 September 1938, and completed on 2 March 1939. Designed as a general-purpose vessel, and intended for use as a survey ship in the West Indies, Pelican was modified during her build for service as a convoy escort and anti-submarine warfare ship.

== Service history ==
After commissioning and working up Pelican was assigned to Fishery Protection, and at the outbreak of the Second World War joined convoy defence duties in the North Sea. In April 1940 Pelican took part in the Norwegian Campaign and was badly damaged in an air raid off Narvik.

After repairs Pelican returned to local escort work but spent much of 1941 under repair following enemy action and accidental damage.

In January 1942 Pelican was assigned to 45 Escort Group escorting OS/SL convoys to and from West Africa. In July 1942 she took part in the destruction of U-136 while escorting convoy OS 33. In October she was part of the escort force for Operation Torch.

After repairs and a refit Pelican was appointed senior officers ship to 1st Support Group, tasked with reinforcing convoys under attack. In May 1943 the group joined the battle around convoy ONS 5, sinking U-438. In June with ONS 10, Pelican sank U-334. In the autumn of 1943 1SG worked on the Gibraltar route, but saw little action.

In March 1944 after a further refit Pelican was assigned to 7 EG patrolling outside the Bay of Biscay; there she took part in the destruction of U-448. In June 1944 Pelican was part of Operation Neptune, escorting troops and supplies to and from Normandy until withdrawn for refit prior to joining the British Pacific Fleet.

On passage to the Far East Pelican was accidentally damaged at Aden and spent the next year at various dockyards under repair.

== Post war service ==
With the end of hostilities Pelican remained in service, operating with the Mediterranean Fleet. She received the new pennant number 'F86' and was based in Malta, as part of the 2nd Frigate Flotilla. This Flotilla took part in patrols preventing illegal immigrants prior to the foundation of the state of Israel. In 1951 she was paid off and laid up in Reserve.

Re-commissioned in 1954 she served in the South Atlantic before finally decommissioning in 1956. Pelican was scrapped in 1958.

== Battle honours ==
During her service Pelican was awarded five battle honours.

- Norway 1940
- Atlantic 1942–44
- North Africa 1942
- Normandy 1944
- English Channel 1944

== Successes ==
During her service Pelican was credited with the destruction of four U-boats:

Date	U-boat	Type	Location	Notes
11 July 1942	U-136	VIIC	NW of Madeira; 33°30′N 22°52′W	d/c and sunk by Spey, Pelican, Léopard
6 May 1943	U-438	VIIC	NE of Newfoundland; 52°00′N 38°20′W	d/c by Pelican
14 June 1943	U-334	VIIC	W of Butt of Lewis; 58°16′N 45°10′W	d/c by Jed, Pelican
14 April 1944	U-448	VIIC	N of Azores; 46°22′N 19°35′W	d/c, gunfire, by HMCS Swansea, Pelican
