= Soviet destroyer Razyaryonny =

Soviet Navy's Gnevny-class destroyer

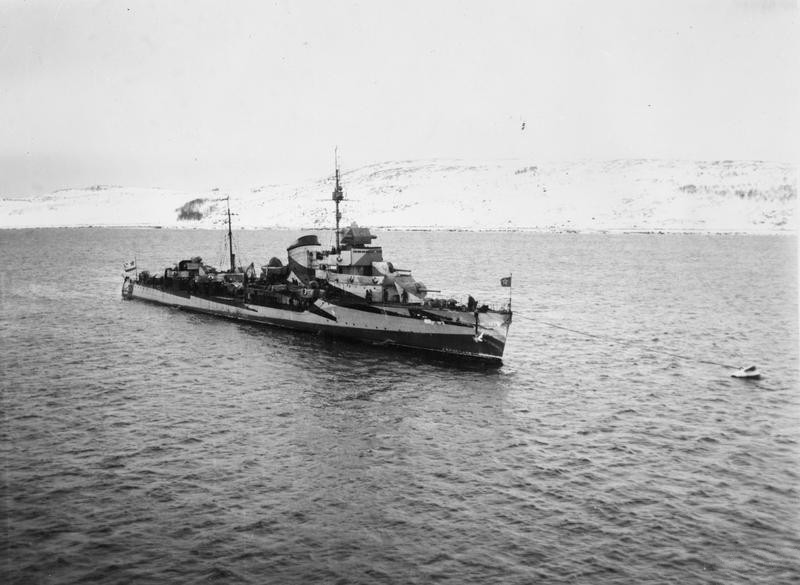
- Aerial view of sister ship Razumny, March 1944

History

Soviet Union
- Name: Razyaryonny
- Ordered: 2nd Five-Year Plan
- Builder: Shipyard No. 198 (Andre Marti (South)), Nikolayev; Shipyard No. 199, Komsomolsk-on-Amur
- Laid down: 15 September 1936; 17 September 1937
- Launched: 22 May 1941
- Completed: 27 November 1941
- Commissioned: 14 December 1941
- Renamed: OS-4, 27 December 1956
- Reclassified: As a test ship, 27 December 1956
- Stricken: 1 March 1958
- Fate: Scuttled, October 1957

General characteristics (as built)
- Class & type: Gnevny-class destroyer
- Displacement: 1,612 t (1,587 long tons) (standard)
- Length: 112.8 m (370 ft 1 in) (o/a)
- Beam: 10.2 m (33 ft 6 in)
- Draft: 4.8 m (15 ft 9 in)
- Installed power: 3 water-tube boilers; 48,000 shp (36,000 kW)
- Propulsion: 2 shafts; 2 geared steam turbines
- Speed: 38 knots (70 km/h; 44 mph)
- Range: 2,720 nmi (5,040 km; 3,130 mi) at 19 knots (35 km/h; 22 mph)
- Complement: 197 (236 wartime)
- Sensors & processing systems: Mars hydrophone
- Armament: 4 × single 130 mm (5.1 in) guns; 2 × single 76.2 mm (3 in) AA guns; 2 × single 45 mm (1.8 in) AA guns; 2 × single 12.7 mm (0.50 in) AA machineguns; 2 × triple 533 mm (21 in) torpedo tubes; 60–96 mines; 2 × depth charge racks, 25 depth charges

Razyaryonny (Russian: Разъярённый, lit. 'Furious') was one of 29 Gnevny-class destroyers (officially known as Project 7) built for the Soviet Navy during the late 1930s. Originally named Peredovoy, she was renamed Razyaryonny before completion in late 1941, and was assigned to the Pacific Fleet.

About a year after the German invasion of Russia in June 1941, she was ordered to join the Northern Fleet, sailing through the Arctic Ocean. Together with several other destroyers, Razyaryonny left the Soviet Far East in July 1942 and arrived off Murmansk three months later, suffering a bent propeller shaft that during the journey that kept her under repair until January 1943. Just days after becoming operational, she ran aground and was under repair until June. Escorting convoys from mid-1943, the destroyer was torpedoed by a German submarine in January 1945, losing her stern. Razyaryonny was repaired postwar using a stern salvaged from a sunken sister ship and served until the late 1950s, when she was sunk during a nuclear test.

== Design and description ==
Having decided to build the large and expensive 40-knot (74 km/h; 46 mph) Leningrad-class destroyer leaders, the Soviet Navy sought Italian assistance in designing smaller and cheaper destroyers. They licensed the plans for the Folgore class and, in modifying it for their purposes, overloaded a design that was already somewhat marginally stable.

The Gnevnys had an overall length of 112.8 meters (370 ft 1 in), a beam of 10.2 meters (33 ft 6 in), and a draft of 4.8 meters (15 ft 9 in) at deep load. The ships were significantly overweight, almost 200 metric tons (197 long tons) heavier than designed, displacing 1,612 metric tons (1,587 long tons) at standard load and 2,039 metric tons (2,007 long tons) at deep load. Their crew numbered 197 officers and sailors in peacetime and 236 in wartime. The ships had a pair of geared steam turbines, each driving one propeller, rated to produce 48,000 shaft horsepower (36,000 kW) using steam from three water-tube boilers which was intended to give them a maximum speed of 37 knots (69 km/h; 43 mph). The designers had been conservative in rating the turbines and many, but not all, of the ships handily exceeded their designed speed during their sea trials. Like her sisters with the Northern Fleet, Razyaryonny reached 37 knots in 1943. She had a range of 1,750 nautical miles (3,240 km; 2,010 mi) at 19 knots (35 km/h; 22 mph).

As built, the Gnevny-class ships mounted four 130-millimeter (5.1 in) B-13 guns, protected by gun shields, in two pairs of superfiring single mounts fore and aft of the superstructure. Anti-aircraft defense was provided by a pair of 76.2-millimeter (3 in) 34-K anti-aircraft (AA) guns in single mounts and a pair of 45-millimeter (1.8 in) 21-K AA guns as well as two 12.7-millimeter (0.50 in) DK or DShK machine guns. They carried six 533 mm (21 in) torpedo tubes in two rotating triple mounts amidships; each tube was provided with a reload. The ships could also carry a maximum of either 60 or 95 mines and 25 depth charges. They were fitted with a set of Mars hydrophones for anti-submarine work, although they were useless at speeds over 3 knots (5.6 km/h; 3.5 mph). The ships were equipped with two K-1 paravanes intended to destroy mines and a pair of depth-charge throwers.

== Construction and service ==
Major components for the ship that became Razyaryonny were laid down at Shipyard No. 198 (Andre Marti South) in Nikolayev on 15 September 1936 as yard number 326 and were then railed to Shipyard No. 199 at Komsomolsk-on-Amur in the Russian Far East, for completion where the ship was laid down again on 17 September 1937 as Peredovoy. She was renamed Razvitoy on 25 September 1940 and was launched on 22 May 1941 after being renamed Razyaryonny on 16 May. The ship was completed on 27 November and joined the Pacific Fleet on 14 December 1941.

As a result of the weakness of the Northern Fleet and the importance of the Arctic convoys of World War II, Stavka decided to transfer several modern ships from the Pacific to the Northern Fleet in May 1942; this was ordered by People's Commissar of the Navy Admiral Nikolay Kuznetsov on 18 June. Razyaryonny and her sisters Razumny and Revnostny, together with the destroyer leader Baku, were planned to be transferred to the Northern Fleet as the Expedition of Special Purpose (EON)-18, the first time that Soviet warships would use the Northern Sea Route to steam from east to west. Razyaryonny had her hull strengthened against ice during June and July, departing Vladivostok with EON-18 on 15 July. While in Providence Bay on 30 July, one of her screws grounded, severely damaging its blades. It was replaced by a spare from Razumny within a week, but her speed had to be reduced to 8 knots (15 km/h; 9.2 mph) due to vibrations from a bent propeller shaft. Resuming the journey, the expedition entered the Chukchi Sea, where on 17 August Razyaryonny became trapped between ice floes, needing to be extricated by the icebreakers Mikoyan and Kaganovich. She was towed by Baku for most of the way from Ambarchik to Dikson, where her left screw was replaced and right screw removed. With only one screw the destroyer was still able to make 25 knots (46 km/h; 29 mph). After the expedition reached Kola Bay on 14 October, Razyaryonny was placed in a floating dock at Cape Abram-Karg, where she was repaired by the beginning of 1943.

Razyaryonny made her first sortie on 2 January 1943, rendezvousing with Allied transports. During this mission, she escaped damage from her stem touching the seafloor while approaching Salny Island in fog. Six days later, however, the destroyer ran aground on Salny Island en route to Vaenga after a power failure temporarily disabled steering. She managed to return to Murmansk under her own power, but a bent bow forced her to put in for repairs, which lasted until 25 June. As a result of this incident, her captain, Kapitan-leytenant Nikolay Nikolsky, was stripped of his rank and sent to a penal battalion, resuming his rank after being wounded; Nikolsky went on to command Razumny and two other destroyers before the end of the war.

During the second half of 1943 and 1944, Razyaryonny served on convoy escort and patrol duty, escorting 40 convoys between August 1943 and January 1945. With a detachment of ships, she searched for German warships as far as Berlevåg in far northern Norway on 26 October, and finding none, shelled Vardø during the Petsamo–Kirkenes Offensive. Norwegian fishing boat Spurven was sunk at Vardo. While escorting Convoy KP-1 to Liinakhamari with Razumny on 23 January 1945, the destroyer discovered the German submarine U-293 with her sonar at 12:20. The two destroyers began hunting the submarine, which struck the stern of Razyaryonny with a GNAT torpedo at 12:50. Her stern was almost torn off and a fire broke out; the explosion killed 38 crew members and wounded 17. Initial attempts to tow her failed due to the condition of the stern, which caused the tow rope to snap. The stern fell off around 20:00 and the destroyer was towed back to Pechenga and thence to Murmansk. Repairs were completed postwar in 1946 at SRZ-25 in Rosta, Murmansk, with the salvaged stern of her sunken sister Stremitelny being attached.

Razyaryonny became part of the White Sea Flotilla on 1 March 1954, but was removed from the combat fleet on 17 February 1956 before being reclassified as the test ship OS-4 ten days later. The former destroyer participated in nuclear tests on 7 September and 10 October 1957, being sunk in Chyornaya bay of Novaya Zemlya during the latter. She was struck from the Soviet Navy on 1 March 1958.

== Sources ==
- Balakin, Sergey (2007). Легендарные "семёрки" Эсминцы "сталинской" серии [Legendary Sevens: Stalin's destroyer series] (in Russian). Moscow: Yauza/Eksmo. ISBN 978-5-699-23784-5.
- Berezhnoy, Sergey (2002). Крейсера и миноносцы. Справочник [Guide to Cruisers and Destroyers] (in Russian). Moscow: Voenizdat. ISBN 5-203-01780-8.
- Budzbon, Przemysaw (1980). "Soviet Union". In Chesneau, Roger (ed.). Conway's All the World's Fighting Ships 1922–1946. Greenwich, UK: Conway Maritime Press. pp. 318–346. ISBN 0-85177-146-7.
- Hill, Alexander (2018). Soviet Destroyers of World War II. New Vanguard. Vol. 256. Oxford, UK: Osprey Publishing. ISBN 978-1-4728-2256-7.
- Kachur, Pavel (2008). "Гончие псы" Красного флота. "Ташкент", "Баку", "Ленинград" [Hounds of the Red Fleet: Tashkent, Baku, Leningrad] (in Russian). Moscow: Yauza/Eksmo. ISBN 978-5-699-31614-4.
- Platonov, Andrey V. (2002). Энциклопедия советских надводных кораблей 1941–1945 [Encyclopedia of Soviet Surface Ships 1941–1945] (in Russian). Saint Petersburg: Poligon. ISBN 5-89173-178-9.
- Rohwer, Jürgen (2005). Chronology of the War at Sea 1939–1945: The Naval History of World War Two (Third Revised ed.). Annapolis, Maryland: Naval Institute Press. ISBN 1-59114-119-2.
- Rohwer, Jürgen & Monakov, Mikhail S. (2001). Stalin's Ocean-Going Fleet. London: Frank Cass. ISBN 0-7146-4895-7.
- Yakubov, Vladimir & Worth, Richard (2008). "The Soviet Project 7/7U Destroyers". In Jordan, John & Dent, Stephen (eds.). Warship 2008. London: Conway. pp. 99–114. ISBN 978-1-84486-062-3.
