= German submarine U-383 =

German World War II submarine

History

Nazi Germany
- Name: U-383
- Ordered: 15 August 1940
- Builder: Howaldtswerke, Kiel
- Yard number: 14
- Laid down: 29 March 1941
- Launched: 22 April 1942
- Commissioned: 6 June 1942
- Fate: Sunk on 1 August 1943
- Badge

General characteristics
- Class & type: Type VIIC submarine
- Displacement: 769 tonnes (757 long tons) surfaced; 871 t (857 long tons) submerged
- Length: 67.10 m (220 ft 2 in) o/a; 50.50 m (165 ft 8 in) pressure hull
- Beam: 6.20 m (20 ft 4 in) o/a; 4.70 m (15 ft 5 in) pressure hull
- Height: 9.60 m (31 ft 6 in)
- Draught: 4.74 m (15 ft 7 in)
- Installed power: 2,800–3,200 PS (2,100–2,400 kW; 2,800–3,200 bhp) (diesels); 750 PS (550 kW; 740 shp) (electric)
- Propulsion: 2 shafts; 2 × diesel engines; 2 × electric motors
- Speed: 17.7 knots (32.8 km/h; 20.4 mph) surfaced; 7.6 knots (14.1 km/h; 8.7 mph) submerged
- Range: 8,500 nmi (15,700 km; 9,800 mi) at 10 knots (19 km/h; 12 mph) surfaced; 80 nmi (150 km; 92 mi) at 4 knots (7.4 km/h; 4.6 mph) submerged
- Test depth: 230 m (750 ft); Crush depth: 250–295 m (820–968 ft)
- Complement: 4 officers, 40–56 enlisted
- Armament: 5 × 53.3 cm (21 in) torpedo tubes (four bow, one stern); 14 × torpedoes; 1 × 8.8 cm (3.46 in) deck gun (220 rounds); 1 x 2 cm (0.79 in) C/30 AA gun

Service record
- Part of: 8th U-boat Flotilla; 6 June – 30 September 1942; 9th U-boat Flotilla; 1 October 1942 – 1 August 1943
- Identification codes: M 41 101
- Commanders: Kptlt. Horst Kremser; 6 June 1942 – 1 August 1943
- Operations: 4 patrols: 1st patrol: 17 October – 9 December 1942; 2nd patrol: 6 January – 10 March 1943; 3rd patrol: 17 April – 25 May 1943; 4th patrol: 27 July – 1 August 1943
- Victories: 1 merchant ship sunk (423 GRT)

German submarine U-383 was a Type VIIC U-boat of Nazi Germany's Kriegsmarine during World War II.

The submarine was laid down on 29 March 1941 at the Howaldtswerke yard at Kiel, launched on 22 April 1942, and commissioned on 6 June under the command of Oberleutnant zur See Horst Kremser.

== Design ==
German Type VIIC submarines were preceded by the shorter Type VIIB submarines. U-383 had a displacement of 769 tonnes (757 long tons) when at the surface and 871 tonnes (857 long tons) while submerged. She had a total length of 67.10 m (220 ft 2 in), a pressure hull length of 50.50 m (165 ft 8 in), a beam of 6.20 m (20 ft 4 in), a height of 9.60 m (31 ft 6 in), and a draught of 4.74 m (15 ft 7 in). The submarine was powered by two Germaniawerft F46 four-stroke, six-cylinder supercharged diesel engines producing a total of 2,800 to 3,200 metric horsepower (2,060 to 2,350 kW; 2,760 to 3,160 shp) for use while surfaced, two Garbe, Lahmeyer & Co. RP 137/c double-acting electric motors producing a total of 750 metric horsepower (550 kW; 740 shp) for use while submerged. She had two shafts and two 1.23 m (4 ft) propellers. The boat was capable of operating at depths of up to 230 metres (750 ft).

The submarine had a maximum surface speed of 17.7 knots (32.8 km/h; 20.4 mph) and a maximum submerged speed of 7.6 knots (14.1 km/h; 8.7 mph). When submerged, the boat could operate for 80 nautical miles (150 km; 92 mi) at 4 knots (7.4 km/h; 4.6 mph); when surfaced, she could travel 8,500 nautical miles (15,700 km; 9,800 mi) at 10 knots (19 km/h; 12 mph). U-383 was fitted with five 53.3 cm (21 in) torpedo tubes (four fitted at the bow and one at the stern), fourteen torpedoes, one 8.8 cm (3.46 in) SK C/35 naval gun, 220 rounds, and a 2 cm (0.79 in) C/30 anti-aircraft gun. The boat had a complement of between forty-four and sixty.

== Service history ==
U-383 served with the 8th U-boat Flotilla for training, and then operationally with the 9th flotilla from 1 October 1942 to 1 August 1943. She completed four patrols in that time, sinking only one ship, the 423 gross register tons (GRT) Icelandic trawler Jon Olafsson on 24 October 1942, during her first patrol.

On the evening of 1 August 1943 U-383 was attacked west of Brittany, at position 47°24′N 12°10′W, by a Short Sunderland of No. 228 Squadron RAF. Responding with flak, the U-boat holed the fuselage and shot away the starboard float and aileron of the aircraft, which pressed home its attack and straddled the U-boat with depth charges before heading back to base. Kremser radioed for assistance, and though three U-boats and three torpedo boats searched during the night and the next day, they failed to locate the crippled U-383 and she was presumed lost.

=== Wolfpacks ===
U-383 took part in ten wolfpacks, namely:

- Puma (26 – 29 October 1942)
- Natter (30 October – 8 November 1942)
- Kreuzotter (8 – 18 November 1942)
- Habicht (10 – 19 January 1943)
- Haudegen (19 January – 15 February 1943)
- Sturmbock (23 – 26 February 1943)
- Amsel (22 April – 3 May 1943)
- Amsel 2 (3 – 6 May 1943)
- Elbe (7 – 10 May 1943)
- Elbe 2 (10 – 14 May 1943)

== Summary of raiding history ==
Date	Ship Name	Nationality	Tonnage (GRT)	Fate
24 October 1942	Jon Olafsson	Iceland	423	Sunk

== Bibliography ==
- Busch, Rainer; Röll, Hans-Joachim (1999). German U-boat commanders of World War II : a biographical dictionary. Translated by Brooks, Geoffrey. London, Annapolis, Md: Greenhill Books, Naval Institute Press. ISBN 1-55750-186-6.
- Busch, Rainer; Röll, Hans-Joachim (1999). Deutsche U-Boot-Verluste von September 1939 bis Mai 1945 [German U-boat losses from September 1939 to May 1945]. Der U-Boot-Krieg (in German). Vol. IV. Hamburg, Berlin, Bonn: Mittler. ISBN 3-8132-0514-2.
- Gröner, Erich; Jung, Dieter; Maass, Martin (1991). U-boats and Mine Warfare Vessels. German Warships 1815–1945. Vol. 2. Translated by Thomas, Keith; Magowan, Rachel. London: Conway Maritime Press. ISBN 0-85177-593-4.
- Bishop, Chris (2006). Kriegsmarine U-Boats, 1939-45. London: Amber Books. ISBN 978-1-904687-96-2.
- Kemp, Paul (1999). U-Boats Destroyed - German Submarine Losses in the World Wars. London: Arms & Armour. ISBN 1-85409-515-3.
