= German submarine U-296 =

German World War II submarine

History

Nazi Germany
- Name: U-296
- Ordered: 14 October 1941
- Builder: Bremer Vulkan Werft, Bremen-Vegesack
- Yard number: 61
- Laid down: 23 January 1943
- Launched: 5 September 1943
- Commissioned: 3 November 1943
- Fate: Sunk 12 March 1945 in the western entrance of the Northern Channel by a British mine

General characteristics
- Class & type: Type VIIC/41 submarine
- Displacement: 759 tonnes (747 long tons) surfaced; 860 t (846 long tons) submerged
- Length: 67.10 m (220 ft 2 in) o/a; 50.50 m (165 ft 8 in) pressure hull
- Beam: 6.20 m (20 ft 4 in) o/a; 4.70 m (15 ft 5 in) pressure hull
- Height: 9.60 m (31 ft 6 in)
- Draught: 4.74 m (15 ft 7 in)
- Installed power: 2,800–3,200 PS (2,100–2,400 kW; 2,800–3,200 bhp) (diesels); 750 PS (550 kW; 740 shp) (electric)
- Propulsion: 2 shafts; 2 × diesel engines; 2 × electric motors
- Speed: 17.7 knots (32.8 km/h; 20.4 mph) surfaced; 7.6 knots (14.1 km/h; 8.7 mph) submerged
- Range: 8,500 nmi (15,700 km; 9,800 mi) at 10 knots (19 km/h; 12 mph) surfaced; 80 nmi (150 km; 92 mi) at 4 knots (7.4 km/h; 4.6 mph) submerged
- Test depth: 250 m (820 ft); Crush depth: 275–325 m (902–1,066 ft)
- Complement: 4 officers, 40–56 enlisted
- Armament: 5 × 53.3 cm (21 in) torpedo tubes (four bow, one stern); 14 × torpedoes; 1 × 8.8 cm (3.46 in) deck gun (220 rounds); 1 × 3.7 cm (1.5 in) Flak M42 AA gun; 2 × 2 cm (0.79 in) C/30 AA guns

Service record
- Part of: 8th U-boat Flotilla; 3 November 1943 – 31 July 1944; 9th U-boat Flotilla; 1 August – 30 September 1944; 11th U-boat Flotilla; 1 October 1944 – 12 March 1945
- Identification codes: M 53 423
- Commanders: Oblt.z.S. / Kptlt. Karl-Heinz Rasch; 3 November 1943 – 12 March 1945
- Operations: 3 patrols: 1st patrol: 16 August – 29 September 1944; 2nd patrol: a. 4 November – 25 December 1944; b. 26 – 27 January 1945; 3rd patrol: 28 February – 12 March 1945
- Victories: None

German submarine U-296 was a Type VIIC/41 U-boat of Nazi Germany's Kriegsmarine during World War II.

She was laid down on 23 January 1943 by the Bremer Vulkan Werft (yard) at Bremen-Vegesack as yard number 61, launched on 5 September 1943 and commissioned on 3 November with Oberleutnant zur See Karl-Heinz Rasch in command.

In three patrols, she did not sink or damage any ships.

She was regarded as missing with all hands (42 men), in the approaches to the North Channel, (between Northern Ireland and mainland Great Britain), in March 1945.

== Design ==
German Type VIIC/41 submarines were preceded by the shorter Type VIIB submarines. U-296 had a displacement of 759 tonnes (747 long tons) when at the surface and 860 tonnes (850 long tons) while submerged. She had a total length of 67.10 m (220 ft 2 in), a pressure hull length of 50.50 m (165 ft 8 in), a beam of 6.20 m (20 ft 4 in), a height of 9.60 m (31 ft 6 in), and a draught of 4.74 m (15 ft 7 in). The submarine was powered by two Germaniawerft F46 four-stroke, six-cylinder supercharged diesel engines producing a total of 2,800 to 3,200 metric horsepower (2,060 to 2,350 kW; 2,760 to 3,160 shp) for use while surfaced, two AEG GU 460/8–27 double-acting electric motors producing a total of 750 metric horsepower (550 kW; 740 shp) for use while submerged. She had two shafts and two 1.23 m (4 ft) propellers. The boat was capable of operating at depths of up to 230 metres (750 ft).

The submarine had a maximum surface speed of 17.7 knots (32.8 km/h; 20.4 mph) and a maximum submerged speed of 7.6 knots (14.1 km/h; 8.7 mph). When submerged, the boat could operate for 80 nautical miles (150 km; 92 mi) at 4 knots (7.4 km/h; 4.6 mph); when surfaced, she could travel 8,500 nautical miles (15,700 km; 9,800 mi) at 10 knots (19 km/h; 12 mph). U-296 was fitted with five 53.3 cm (21 in) torpedo tubes (four fitted at the bow and one at the stern), fourteen torpedoes, one 8.8 cm (3.46 in) SK C/35 naval gun, (220 rounds), one 3.7 cm (1.5 in) Flak M42 and two 2 cm (0.79 in) C/30 anti-aircraft guns. The boat had a complement of between forty-four and sixty.

== Service history ==
The boat's service life began with training with the 8th U-boat Flotilla in November 1943. She was then transferred to the 9th flotilla for operations on 1 August 1944. She was reassigned to the 11th flotilla on 1 October.

She made the short journey from Kiel in Germany to Horten Naval Base in Norway, arriving on 31 July 1944 and moving on to Bergen on 6 August.

=== First patrol ===
U-296's first patrol between Bergen and Trondheim, took her through the 'gap' between the Shetland and Faroe Islands, both outbound and inbound.

=== Second patrol ===
The boat's second sortie was similar to her first; starting in Trondheim and terminating in Stavanger. She reached northern Scotland, but this time she passed between Iceland and the Faroe Islands.

=== Third patrol and fate ===
Having left Bergen in late February 1945, she was listed as missing on 12 March in the North Channel, a possible victim of a mine.

=== Previously recorded fate ===
U-296 was originally thought to have been sunk by a torpedo from a British B-24 Liberator of No. 120 Squadron RAF. This attack was actually against a non-submarine target.

== See also ==
- Battle of the Atlantic (1939-1945)

== Bibliography ==
- Gröner, Erich; Jung, Dieter; Maass, Martin (1991). U-boats and Mine Warfare Vessels. German Warships 1815–1945. Vol. 2. Translated by Thomas, Keith; Magowan, Rachel. London: Conway Maritime Press. ISBN 0-85177-593-4.
- Busch, Rainer; Röll, Hans-Joachim (1999). German U-boat commanders of World War II : a biographical dictionary. Translated by Brooks, Geoffrey. London, Annapolis, Md: Greenhill Books, Naval Institute Press. ISBN 1-55750-186-6.
- Busch, Rainer; Röll, Hans-Joachim (1999). Deutsche U-Boot-Verluste von September 1939 bis Mai 1945 [German U-boat losses from September 1939 to May 1945]. Der U-Boot-Krieg (in German). Vol. IV. Hamburg; Berlin; Bonn: Mittler. ISBN 3-8132-0514-2.
- Kemp, Paul (1999). U-Boats Destroyed - German Submarine Losses in the World Wars. London: Arms & Armour. ISBN 1-85409-515-3.
