= German submarine U-293 =

German World War II submarine

History

Nazi Germany
- Name: U-293
- Ordered: 14 October 1941
- Builder: Bremer Vulkan Werft, Bremen-Vegesack
- Yard number: 58
- Laid down: 17 November 1942
- Launched: 30 July 1943
- Commissioned: 8 September 1943
- Fate: Surrendered on 11 May 1945; sunk as part of Operation Deadlight on 13 December 1945

General characteristics
- Class & type: Type VIIC/41 submarine
- Displacement: 759 tonnes (747 long tons) surfaced; 860 t (846 long tons) submerged
- Length: 67.10 m (220 ft 2 in) o/a; 50.50 m (165 ft 8 in) pressure hull
- Beam: 6.20 m (20 ft 4 in) o/a; 4.70 m (15 ft 5 in) pressure hull
- Height: 9.60 m (31 ft 6 in)
- Draught: 4.74 m (15 ft 7 in)
- Installed power: 2,800–3,200 PS (2,100–2,400 kW; 2,800–3,200 bhp) (diesels); 750 PS (550 kW; 740 shp) (electric)
- Propulsion: 2 shafts; 2 × diesel engines; 2 × electric motors
- Speed: 17.7 knots (32.8 km/h; 20.4 mph) surfaced; 7.6 knots (14.1 km/h; 8.7 mph) submerged
- Range: 8,500 nmi (15,700 km; 9,800 mi) at 10 knots (19 km/h; 12 mph) surfaced; 80 nmi (150 km; 92 mi) at 4 knots (7.4 km/h; 4.6 mph) submerged
- Test depth: 250 m (820 ft); Crush depth: 275–325 m (902–1,066 ft)
- Complement: 4 officers, 40–56 enlisted
- Armament: 5 × 53.3 cm (21 in) torpedo tubes (four bow, one stern); 14 × torpedoes; 1 × 8.8 cm (3.46 in) deck gun (220 rounds); 1 × 3.7 cm (1.5 in) Flak M42 AA gun; 2 × 2 cm (0.79 in) C/30 AA guns

Service record
- Part of: 8th U-boat Flotilla; 8 September 1943 – 1 April 1944; 9th U-boat Flotilla; 1 April – 31 July 1944; 11th U-boat Flotilla; 1 August – 4 September 1944; 13th U-boat Flotilla; 5 September 1944 – 8 May 1945
- Identification codes: M 54 412
- Commanders: Kptlt. Leonhard Klingspor; 8 September 1943 – 11 May 1945; Oblt.z.S. Erich Steinbrink; December 1944 – March 1945
- Operations: 6 patrols: 1st patrol: 16 – 22 September 1944; 2nd patrol: 25 September – 4 October 1944; 3rd patrol: 14 October – 6 November 1944; 4th patrol: 21 November – 19 December 1944; 5th patrol: 1 January – 15 February 1945; 6th patrol: 1 April – 11 May 1945
- Victories: 1 warship damaged (1,658 tons)

German submarine U-293 was a Type VIIC/41 U-boat of Nazi Germany's Kriegsmarine during World War II. She was laid down on 17 November 1942 by the Bremer Vulkan Werft (yard) at Bremen-Vegesack as yard number 58, launched on 30 July 1943, and commissioned on 8 September with Kapitänleutnant Leonhard Klingspor in command. In six patrols, she damaged one warship. She surrendered at Loch Eriboll in Scotland on 11 May 1945 and was sunk as part of Operation Deadlight on 13 December 1945.

== Design ==
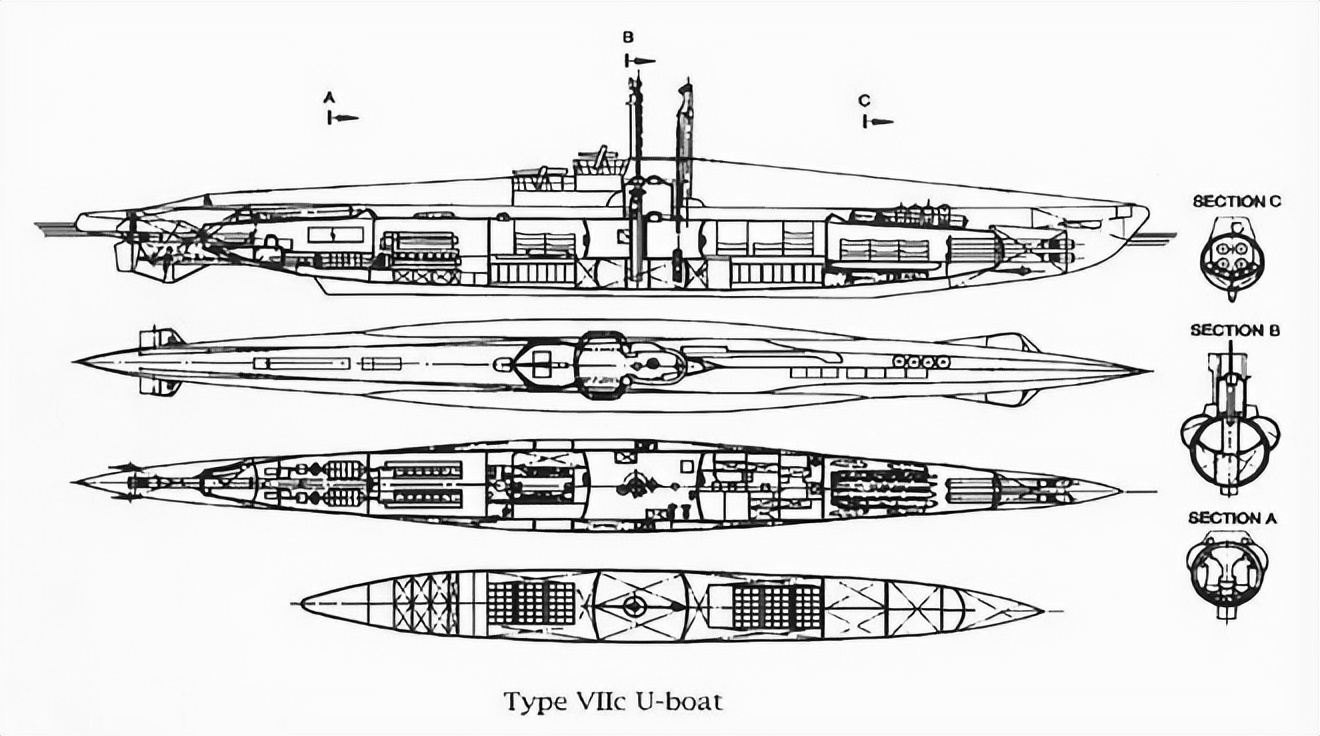
A cross-section of a Type VIIC submarine

German Type VIIC/41 submarines were preceded by the shorter Type VIIB submarines. U-293 had a displacement of 759 tonnes (747 long tons) when at the surface and 860 tonnes (850 long tons) while submerged. She had a total length of 67.10 m (220 ft 2 in), a pressure hull length of 50.50 m (165 ft 8 in), a beam of 6.20 m (20 ft 4 in), a height of 9.60 m (31 ft 6 in), and a draught of 4.74 m (15 ft 7 in). The submarine was powered by two Germaniawerft F46 four-stroke, six-cylinder supercharged diesel engines producing a total of 2,800 to 3,200 metric horsepower (2,060 to 2,350 kW; 2,760 to 3,160 shp) for use while surfaced, two AEG GU 460/8–27 double-acting electric motors producing a total of 750 metric horsepower (550 kW; 740 shp) for use while submerged. She had two shafts and two 1.23 m (4 ft) propellers. The boat was capable of operating at depths of up to 230 metres (750 ft).

The submarine had a maximum surface speed of 17.7 knots (32.8 km/h; 20.4 mph) and a maximum submerged speed of 7.6 knots (14.1 km/h; 8.7 mph). When submerged, the boat could operate for 80 nautical miles (150 km; 92 mi) at 4 knots (7.4 km/h; 4.6 mph); when surfaced, she could travel 8,500 nautical miles (15,700 km; 9,800 mi) at 10 knots (19 km/h; 12 mph). U-293 was fitted with five 53.3 cm (21 in) torpedo tubes (four fitted at the bow and one at the stern), fourteen torpedoes, one 8.8 cm (3.46 in) SK C/35 naval gun, (220 rounds), one 3.7 cm (1.5 in) Flak M42 and two 2 cm (0.79 in) C/30 anti-aircraft guns. The boat had a complement of between forty-four and sixty.

== Service history ==
U-293 was ordered by Kriegsmarine on 14 October 1941. She was laid down just over one year later at Bremer Vulkan, Bremen-Vegesack on 17 November 1942. U-293 was launched from Bremen-Vegesack on 30 July 1943. She was formally commissioned later that year on 8 September 1943. Like all Type VIIC/41 U-boats, U-293 carried five 533 mm (21 in) torpedo tubes (4 located in the bow, 1 in the stern) and had one C35 88mm/L45 deck gun with 220 rounds of ammunition. She could also carry 14 G7e torpedoes or 26 TMA mines and could hold a crew of 44-52 men.

=== First Patrol ===
After her training with the 8th U-boat flotilla, U-293 traveled through German controlled waters for several months, eventually being stationed in Trondheim, after stops at bases such as Arendal, Bergen, and Stavanger. After over a year since being formally commissioned into Kriegsmarine, U-293 began her first wartime patrol under the command of Oblt. Leonhard Klingspor on 16 September 1944. For seven days, U-293 traveled through the Norwegian Sea until arriving at the port of Narvik on 22 September 1944. During this time, U-293 sighted no enemy vessels.

=== Second, Third, and Fourth Patrols ===
Again under the command of Klingspor, U-293 departed from Narvik on 25 September 1944 and ventured out into the Arctic Ocean. During this 10-day patrol, U-293 again found no enemy vessels. On 4 October 1944, U-293 ended her second war patrol by arriving at the port city of Hammerfest, one of the northernmost German U-boat bases in Norway.

U-293's third patrol was longer than her previous patrols. On 14 October 1944, after four days in port, the U-boat left Hammerfest and traveled into the Barents Sea off the north coast of Russia. During the 24-day period, the U-boat again failed to make contact with enemy vessels and again returned to Narvik on 6 November 1944.

U-293's fourth patrol was much like her third. During 29 days at sea, the U-boat traveled to the northern coast of Russia, found no enemy vessels, and once again returned to Narvik on 19 December 1944. After this patrol, the U-boat was put under the command of Oblt. Erich Steinbrink.

=== Fifth Patrol ===
With Steinbrink in command, U-293 departed Narvik on 1 January 1945 in what was to be the longest patrol in her career, once again traveling into the Arctic off Russia's northern coast. Here, on 20 January 1945, U-293 scored her first and only hit of the war. At 10:55 AM local time, the Soviet destroyer Razyaryonny was escorting the convoy "KP-1" and was attempting to hunt down the U-boat along with another ship, Razumny, when she was hit by a torpedo launched from U-293. Razyaryonny was traveling at 16 knots when she was hit in the afterpart. Part of Razyaryonny's stern was lost in the explosion. Despite the attack, her crew managed to save the ship and was later towed by the Soviet minesweeper T-117 to the port of Liinahamari on 21 January 1945. After this attack, U-293 returned to Narvik on 15 February 1945, after spending 46 days at sea.

== Summary of raiding history ==
Date	Ship Name	Nationality	Tonnage (Note: Merchant ship tonnages are in gross register tons. Military vessels are listed by tons displacement.)	Fate
20 January 1945	Razyaryonny	Soviet Navy	1,658	Damaged

== See also ==
- Battle of the Atlantic (1939-1945)

== Bibliography ==
- Busch, Rainer; Röll, Hans-Joachim (1999). German U-boat commanders of World War II : a biographical dictionary. Translated by Brooks, Geoffrey. London, Annapolis, Md: Greenhill Books, Naval Institute Press. ISBN 1-55750-186-6.
- Busch, Rainer; Röll, Hans-Joachim (1999). Deutsche U-Boot-Verluste von September 1939 bis Mai 1945 [German U-boat losses from September 1939 to May 1945]. Der U-Boot-Krieg (in German). Vol. IV. Hamburg, Berlin, Bonn: Mittler. ISBN 3-8132-0514-2.
- Gröner, Erich; Jung, Dieter; Maass, Martin (1991). U-boats and Mine Warfare Vessels. German Warships 1815–1945. Vol. 2. Translated by Thomas, Keith; Magowan, Rachel. London: Conway Maritime Press. ISBN 0-85177-593-4.
