= German submarine U-348 =

German World War II submarine

History

Nazi Germany
- Name: U-348
- Ordered: 10 April 1941
- Builder: Nordseewerke, Emden
- Yard number: 220
- Laid down: 17 November 1942
- Launched: 25 June 1943
- Commissioned: 10 August 1943
- Fate: Sunk by U.S. bombs near Hamburg on 30 March 1945

General characteristics
- Class & type: Type VIIC submarine
- Displacement: 769 tonnes (757 long tons) surfaced; 871 t (857 long tons) submerged
- Length: 67.10 m (220 ft 2 in) o/a; 50.50 m (165 ft 8 in) pressure hull
- Beam: 6.20 m (20 ft 4 in) o/a; 4.70 m (15 ft 5 in) pressure hull
- Height: 9.60 m (31 ft 6 in)
- Draught: 4.74 m (15 ft 7 in)
- Installed power: 2,800–3,200 PS (2,100–2,400 kW; 2,800–3,200 bhp) (diesels); 750 PS (550 kW; 740 shp) (electric)
- Propulsion: 2 shafts; 2 × diesel engines; 2 × electric motors
- Speed: 17.7 knots (32.8 km/h; 20.4 mph) surfaced; 7.6 knots (14.1 km/h; 8.7 mph) submerged
- Range: 8,500 nmi (15,700 km; 9,800 mi) at 10 knots (19 km/h; 12 mph) surfaced; 80 nmi (150 km; 92 mi) at 4 knots (7.4 km/h; 4.6 mph) submerged
- Test depth: 230 m (750 ft); Crush depth: 250–295 m (820–968 ft)
- Complement: 4 officers, 40–56 enlisted
- Armament: 5 × 53.3 cm (21 in) torpedo tubes (four bow, one stern); 14 × torpedoes or 26 TMA mines; 1 × 8.8 cm (3.46 in) deck gun (220 rounds); 2 × twin 2 cm (0.79 in) C/30 anti-aircraft guns

Service record
- Part of: 8th U-boat Flotilla; 10 August 1943 – 31 March 1944; 9th U-boat Flotilla; 1 April – 11 July 1944; 8th U-boat Flotilla; 12 July 1944 – 15 February 1945; 5th U-boat Flotilla; 16 February – 30 March 1945
- Identification codes: M 54 464
- Commanders: Oblt.z.S. Hans-Joachim Förster; July – August 1943; Oblt.z.S. Hans-Norbert Schunck; 10 August 1943 – 30 March 1945; Oblt.z.S. Sigurd Seeger; 18 – 21 June 1944; Oblt.z.S. Kurt-Heinz Nicolay; 26 June – 1 July 1944
- Operations: 6 patrols: 1st patrol: 23 April – 15 May 1944; 2nd patrol: a. 20 May – 11 June 1944; b. 18 – 21 June 1944; c. 26 June – 1 July 1944; d. 11 – 14 July 1944; 3rd patrol: 17 – 22 July 1944; 4th patrol: a. 25 – 28 July 1944; b. 29 July – 3 August 1944; c. 10 – 17 August 1944; 5th patrol: a. 19 August 1944; b. 24 August – 1 September 1944; c. 4 – 14 September 1944; d. 16 September – 4 October 1944; e. 5 – 7 October 1944; 6th patrol: a. 3 – 30 January 1945; b. 5 – 10 February 1945
- Victories: None

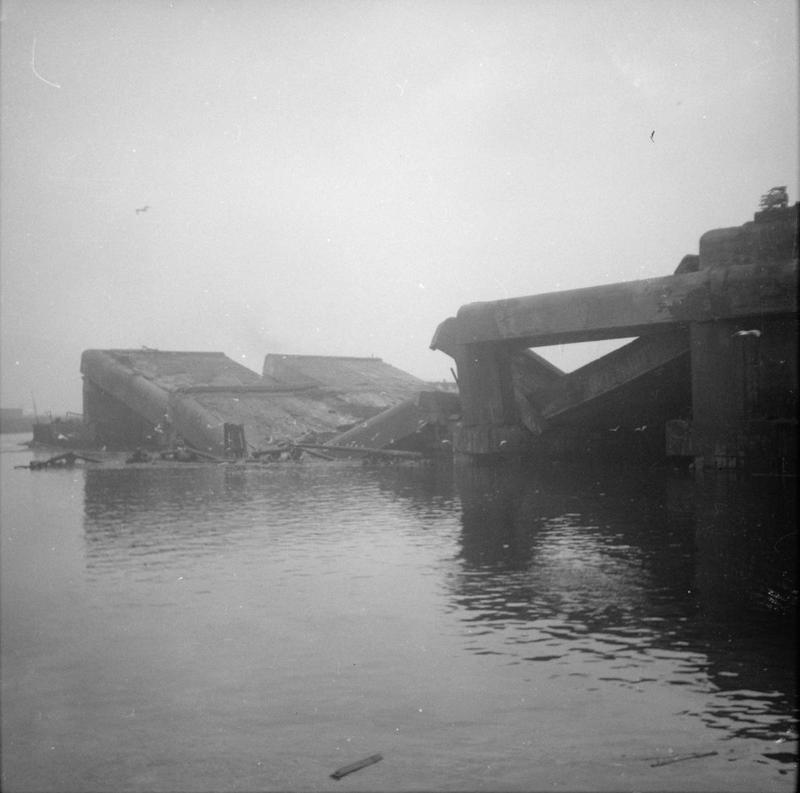
Ruins of the demolished U-boat pens in Hamburg

German submarine U-348 was a Type VIIC U-boat of Nazi Germany's Kriegsmarine during World War II.

She carried out six patrols but sank no ships.

She was sunk near Hamburg by US bombs.

== Design ==
German Type VIIC submarines were preceded by the shorter Type VIIB submarines. U-348 had a displacement of 769 tonnes (757 long tons) when at the surface and 871 tonnes (857 long tons) while submerged. She had a total length of 67.10 m (220 ft 2 in), a pressure hull length of 50.50 m (165 ft 8 in), a beam of 6.20 m (20 ft 4 in), a height of 9.60 m (31 ft 6 in), and a draught of 4.74 m (15 ft 7 in). The submarine was powered by two Germaniawerft F46 four-stroke, six-cylinder supercharged diesel engines producing a total of 2,800 to 3,200 metric horsepower (2,060 to 2,350 kW; 2,760 to 3,160 shp) for use while surfaced, two AEG GU 460/8–27 double-acting electric motors producing a total of 750 metric horsepower (550 kW; 740 shp) for use while submerged. She had two shafts and two 1.23 m (4 ft) propellers. The boat was capable of operating at depths of up to 230 metres (750 ft).

The submarine had a maximum surface speed of 17.7 knots (32.8 km/h; 20.4 mph) and a maximum submerged speed of 7.6 knots (14.1 km/h; 8.7 mph). When submerged, the boat could operate for 80 nautical miles (150 km; 92 mi) at 4 knots (7.4 km/h; 4.6 mph); when surfaced, she could travel 8,500 nautical miles (15,700 km; 9,800 mi) at 10 knots (19 km/h; 12 mph). U-348 was fitted with five 53.3 cm (21 in) torpedo tubes (four fitted at the bow and one at the stern), fourteen torpedoes, one 8.8 cm (3.46 in) SK C/35 naval gun, 220 rounds, and two twin 2 cm (0.79 in) C/30 anti-aircraft guns. The boat had a complement of between forty-four and sixty.

== Service history ==
The submarine was laid down on 17 November 1942 at the Nordseewerke yard at Emden as yard number 220, launched on 25 June 1943 and commissioned on 10 August under the command of Oberleutnant zur See Hans-Norbert Schunck. (Note: Oberleutnant z.S. Hans-Joachim Förster served from June to August 1943 as Baubelehrungs (familiarization) commander in the last days before the boat was commissioned.)

U-348 served with the 8th U-boat Flotilla, for training and then with the 9th flotilla for operations from 1 April 1944. She came back under the command of the 8th flotilla on 12 July and was reassigned to the 5th flotilla on 16 February 1945; she stayed with that organization until her destruction on 30 March.

U-348 made short trips from Kiel in Germany to Stavanger, Kristiansand and Bergen in Norway in April 1944.

=== First, second, and third patrols ===
Her first patrol began with her departure from Bergen on 23 April 1944. The detonation of a landmine near Stavanger on 6 May killed one man and wounded another. She returned to Bergen on the 15th.

The submarine's second foray was uneventful.

U-348's third patrol was preceded by more short trips, this time between Trondheim, Kiel and Reval, (now Tallinn, Estonia).

=== Fourth, fifth and sixth patrols ===
The boat's fourth sortie was divided into three parts in July and August 1944, but kept to the Ostsee (Baltic).

Patrol number five was sub-divided into four. It included departures from Helsinki in Finland and Reval and arrivals at Mösholm and Libau (now Liepāja, Latvia).

Her sixth patrol from Danzig (now Gdańsk, Poland) terminated in Swinemünde (now Świnoujście, Poland).

=== Fate ===
She moved from Swinemünde to Hamburg in February 1945. On 30 March she was destroyed by US bombs during an air-raid.

== Bibliography ==
- Busch, Rainer; Röll, Hans-Joachim (1999). German U-boat commanders of World War II : a biographical dictionary. Translated by Brooks, Geoffrey. London, Annapolis, Md: Greenhill Books, Naval Institute Press. ISBN 1-55750-186-6.
- Busch, Rainer; Röll, Hans-Joachim (1999). Deutsche U-Boot-Verluste von September 1939 bis Mai 1945 [German U-boat losses from September 1939 to May 1945]. Der U-Boot-Krieg (in German). Vol. IV. Hamburg, Berlin, Bonn: Mittler. ISBN 3-8132-0514-2.
- Gröner, Erich; Jung, Dieter; Maass, Martin (1991). U-boats and Mine Warfare Vessels. German Warships 1815–1945. Vol. 2. Translated by Thomas, Keith; Magowan, Rachel. London: Conway Maritime Press. ISBN 0-85177-593-4.
