= German submarine U-771 =

German World War II submarine

History

Nazi Germany
- Name: U-771
- Ordered: 21 November 1940
- Builder: Kriegsmarinewerft Wilhelmshaven
- Yard number: 154
- Laid down: 21 August 1942
- Launched: 26 September 1943
- Commissioned: 18 November 1943
- Fate: Sunk on 11 November 1944

General characteristics
- Class & type: Type VIIC submarine
- Displacement: 769 tonnes (757 long tons) surfaced; 871 t (857 long tons) submerged
- Length: 67.10 m (220 ft 2 in) o/a; 50.50 m (165 ft 8 in) pressure hull
- Beam: 6.20 m (20 ft 4 in) o/a; 4.70 m (15 ft 5 in) pressure hull
- Height: 9.60 m (31 ft 6 in)
- Draught: 4.74 m (15 ft 7 in)
- Installed power: 2,800–3,200 PS (2,100–2,400 kW; 2,800–3,200 bhp) (diesels); 750 PS (550 kW; 740 shp) (electric)
- Propulsion: 2 shafts; 2 × diesel engines; 2 × electric motors
- Speed: 17.7 knots (32.8 km/h; 20.4 mph) surfaced; 7.6 knots (14.1 km/h; 8.7 mph) submerged
- Range: 8,500 nmi (15,700 km; 9,800 mi) at 10 knots (19 km/h; 12 mph) surfaced; 80 nmi (150 km; 92 mi) at 4 knots (7.4 km/h; 4.6 mph) submerged
- Test depth: 230 m (750 ft); Crush depth: 250–295 m (820–968 ft)
- Complement: 4 officers, 40–56 enlisted
- Armament: 5 × 53.3 cm (21 in) torpedo tubes (four bow, one stern); 14 × torpedoes; 1 × 3.7 cm (1.5 in) Flak M42 AA gun; 2 × twin 2 cm (0.79 in) C/30 anti-aircraft guns

Service record
- Part of: 31st U-boat Flotilla; 18 November 1943 – 31 May 1944; 9th U-boat Flotilla; 1 June – 31 July 1944; 11th U-boat Flotilla; 1 August – 30 September 1944; 13th U-boat Flotilla; 1 October – 11 November 1944
- Identification codes: M 54 806
- Commanders: Oblt.z.S. Helmut Block; 18 November 1943 – 11 November 1944
- Operations: 2 patrols: 1st patrol: a. 21 June – 15 July 1944; b. 26 – 28 July 1944; c. 29 July – 1 August 1944; d. 2 – 3 August 1944; e. 5 – 6 August 1944; f. 27 – 30 September 1944; g. 2 – 4 October 1944; 2nd patrol: 14 October – 11 November 1944
- Victories: 1 Allied aircraft shot down

German submarine U-771 was a Type VIIC U-boat of Nazi Germany's Kriegsmarine during World War II. She was ordered on 21 November 1940, and was laid down on 21 August 1942 at Kriegsmarinewerft, Wilhelmshaven, as yard number 154. She was launched on 26 September 1943 and commissioned under the command of Oberleutnant zur See Helmut Block on 18 November of that year.

== Design ==
German Type VIIC submarines were preceded by the shorter Type VIIB submarines. U-771 had a displacement of 769 tonnes (757 long tons) when at the surface and 871 tonnes (857 long tons) while submerged. She had a total length of 67.10 m (220 ft 2 in), a pressure hull length of 50.50 m (165 ft 8 in), a beam of 6.20 m (20 ft 4 in), a height of 9.60 m (31 ft 6 in), and a draught of 4.74 m (15 ft 7 in). The submarine was powered by two Germaniawerft F46 four-stroke, six-cylinder supercharged diesel engines producing a total of 2,800 to 3,200 metric horsepower (2,060 to 2,350 kW; 2,760 to 3,160 shp) for use while surfaced, two Garbe, Lahmeyer & Co. RP 137/c double-acting electric motors producing a total of 750 metric horsepower (550 kW; 740 shp) for use while submerged. She had two shafts and two 1.23 m (4 ft) propellers. The boat was capable of operating at depths of up to 230 metres (750 ft).

The submarine had a maximum surface speed of 17.7 knots (32.8 km/h; 20.4 mph) and a maximum submerged speed of 7.6 knots (14.1 km/h; 8.7 mph). When submerged, the boat could operate for 80 nautical miles (150 km; 92 mi) at 4 knots (7.4 km/h; 4.6 mph); when surfaced, she could travel 8,500 nautical miles (15,700 km; 9,800 mi) at 10 knots (19 km/h; 12 mph). U-771 was fitted with five 53.3 cm (21 in) torpedo tubes (four fitted at the bow and one at the stern), fourteen torpedoes, one 3.7 cm (1.5 in) Flak M42 and two twin 2 cm (0.79 in) C/30 anti-aircraft guns. The boat had a complement of between forty-four and sixty.

== Service history ==
U-771 had a comparatively brief service career. While she was commissioned on 18 November 1943, she was not assigned to any war flotillas until 1 June 1944. She was in action for less than a year before being sunk on 11 November 1944, after only two patrols at sea.

=== First patrol ===
Following training exercises with the 31st U-boat Flotilla from 18 November 1943 until 31 May 1944, U-771 was assigned to the 9th U-boat Flotilla on 1 June 1944, and was given the position as the lead boat in the flotilla. The next day, U-771 left the port city of Hatvik for Bergen, occupied Norway. On 21 June 1944, U-771 began her first war patrol, leaving the port city of Stavanger (at which she had arrived from Bergen the day before). For a period of 25 days, U-771 roamed the North Sea in search of Allied convoys. While she never made contact with any enemy vessels, on 26 June 1944, a British Consolidated Liberator aircraft coded 'N' from No. 86 Squadron RAF engaged U-771 and U-317 just north of the British Isles. U-317 was sunk during the action, but flak from U-771 damaged the Liberator and forced it back to base, where it was judged damaged beyond repair. U-771 continued her patrol. This was the only time during the war that U-771 had any contact with the enemy prior to her sinking. On 15 July, U-771 returned to her U-boat base at Bergen.

=== Second patrol ===
U-771 spent the next three months travelling to various Norwegian ports, including Trondheim, Kristiansand, Bergen, Bogenbucht, and Hammerfest. During this time, U-771 was reassigned to the 11th U-boat Flotilla on 1 August 1944; she remained a part of that flotilla until 30 September, when she was again reassigned, this time to the 13th U-boat Flotilla. On 14 October 1944, U-771 finally left Hammerfest and headed into the Arctic Ocean. Twenty-nine days after she left Hammerfest, on 11 November 1944, U-771 was sunk in the Andfjord near Harstad, Norway, by a torpedo fired by the British submarine HMS Venturer. All 51 of her crewmembers were killed.

=== Wolfpacks ===
U-771 took part in three wolfpacks, namely:

- Zorn (27 – 30 September 1944)
- Regenschirm (14 – 16 October 1944)
- Panther (16 October – 10 November 1944)

== See also ==
- Battle of the Atlantic

== Bibliography ==
- Busch, Rainer; Röll, Hans-Joachim (1999). German U-boat commanders of World War II : a biographical dictionary. Translated by Brooks, Geoffrey. London, Annapolis, Md: Greenhill Books, Naval Institute Press. ISBN 1-55750-186-6.
- Busch, Rainer; Röll, Hans-Joachim (1999). Der U-Boot-Krieg, 1939-1945: Deutsche U-Boot-Verluste von September 1939 bis Mai 1945 [German U-boat losses from September 1939 to May 1945] (in German). Vol. IV. Hamburg, Berlin, Bonn: Mittler. ISBN 3-8132-0514-2.
- Gröner, Eric; Jung, Dieter; Maass, Martin (1991). German Warships 1815-1945: U-boats and Mine Warfare Vessels. Vol. 2. Translated by Thomas, Keith; Magowan, Rachel. London: Conway Maritime Press. ISBN 0-85177-593-4.
- Preisler, Jerome; Kenneth Sewell (2012). Code Name Caesar: The Secret Hunt for U-Boat 864 During World War II. New York: Berkley Books. ISBN 978-0-425-245255.
