= German submarine U-217 =

German World War II submarine

History

Nazi Germany
- Name: U-217
- Ordered: 16 February 1940
- Builder: Germaniawerft, Kiel
- Yard number: 649
- Laid down: 30 January 1941
- Launched: 15 November 1941
- Commissioned: 31 January 1942
- Fate: Sunk, 5 June 1943

General characteristics
- Class & type: Type VIID submarine
- Displacement: 965 tonnes (950 long tons) surfaced; 1,080 t (1,060 long tons) submerged
- Length: 76.90 m (252 ft 4 in) o/a; 59.80 m (196 ft 2 in) pressure hull
- Beam: 6.38 m (20 ft 11 in) o/a; 4.70 m (15 ft 5 in) pressure hull
- Height: 9.70 m (31 ft 10 in)
- Draught: 5.01 m (16 ft 5 in)
- Installed power: 2,800–3,200 PS (2,100–2,400 kW; 2,800–3,200 bhp) (diesels); 750 PS (550 kW; 740 shp) (electric)
- Propulsion: 2 shafts; 2 × diesel engines; 2 × electric motors
- Speed: 16–16.7 knots (29.6–30.9 km/h; 18.4–19.2 mph) surfaced; 7.3 knots (13.5 km/h; 8.4 mph) submerged
- Range: 11,200 nmi (20,700 km; 12,900 mi) at 10 knots (19 km/h; 12 mph) surfaced; 69 nmi (128 km; 79 mi) at 4 knots (7.4 km/h; 4.6 mph) submerged
- Test depth: 200 m (660 ft); Crush depth: 220–240 m (720–790 ft)
- Crew: 4 officers, 40 enlisted
- Armament: 5 × 53.3 cm (21 in) torpedo tubes (four bow, one stern); 12 × torpedoes or 26 × TMA or 39 × TMB tube-launched mines; 5 × vertical launchers with 15 SMA mines; 1 × 8.8 cm (3.46 in) deck gun (220 rounds); 1 × 20 mm AA (4,380 rounds)

Service record
- Part of: 5th U-boat Flotilla; 31 January – 31 July 1942; 9th U-boat Flotilla; 1 August 1942 – 5 June 1943
- Identification codes: M 47 721
- Commanders: Kptlt. Kurt Reichenbach-Klinke; 31 January 1942 – 5 June 1943
- Operations: 3 patrols: 1st patrol: 14 July – 16 October 1942; 2nd patrol: 24 November 1942 – 23 February 1943; 3rd patrol: 19 April – 5 June 1943
- Victories: 3 merchant ships sunk (10,651 GRT)

German submarine U-217 was a Type VIID mine-laying U-boat of Nazi Germany's Kriegsmarine during World War II.

== Design ==
As one of the six German Type VIID submarines, U-217 had a displacement of 965 tonnes (950 long tons) when at the surface and 1,080 tonnes (1,060 long tons) while submerged. She had a total length of 76.90 m (252 ft 4 in), a pressure hull length of 59.80 m (196 ft 2 in), a beam of 6.38 m (20 ft 11 in), a height of 9.70 m (31 ft 10 in), and a draught of 5.01 m (16 ft 5 in). The submarine was powered by two Germaniawerft F46 supercharged four-stroke, six-cylinder diesel engines producing a total of 2,800 to 3,200 metric horsepower (2,060 to 2,350 kW; 2,760 to 3,160 shp) for use while surfaced, two AEG GU 460/8-276 double-acting electric motors producing a total of 750 shaft horsepower (760 PS; 560 kW) for use while submerged. She had two shafts and two 1.23 m (4 ft) propellers. The boat was capable of operating at depths of up to 230 metres (750 ft).

The submarine had a maximum surface speed of 16–16.7 knots (29.6–30.9 km/h; 18.4–19.2 mph) and a maximum submerged speed of 7.3 knots (13.5 km/h; 8.4 mph). When submerged, the boat could operate for 69 nautical miles (128 km; 79 mi) at 4 knots (7.4 km/h; 4.6 mph); when surfaced, she could travel 11,200 nautical miles (20,700 km; 12,900 mi) at 10 knots (19 km/h; 12 mph). U-217 was fitted with five 53.3 cm (21 in) torpedo tubes (four fitted at the bow and one at the stern), twelve torpedoes, one 8.8 cm (3.46 in) SK C/35 naval gun, 220 rounds, and an anti-aircraft gun, in addition to five mine tubes with fifteen SMA mines. The boat had a complement of around forty-four (4 officers and 40 enlisted men).

== Service history ==
She was laid down on 30 January 1941, launched on 15 November and commissioned on 31 January 1942, U-217 served with the 5th U-boat Flotilla in a training capacity before moving on to the operational 9th flotilla on 1 August 1942 until she was sunk. U-217 completed three patrols and sank three ships totalling 10,651 gross register tons (GRT).

She was sunk on 5 June 1943 in the mid-Atlantic with all hands by depth charges dropped by Grumman TBF Avengers from the escort carrier Bogue (CVE-9). The wreck lies at 30°18′N 042°50′W, near the Mid-Atlantic Ridge.

== Wolfpacks ==
U-217 took part in two wolfpacks, namely:

- Pirat (30 July – 3 August 1942)
- Trutz (1 – 5 June 1943)

== Summary of raiding history ==
Date	Name	Nationality	Tonnage (GRT)	Fate
19 August 1942	Sea Gull D	United Kingdom	75	Sunk
14 December 1942	Etna	Sweden	2,619	Sunk
3 February 1943	Rhexnor	United Kingdom	7,957	Sunk

== Bibliography ==
- Busch, Rainer; Röll, Hans-Joachim (1999). German U-boat commanders of World War II : a biographical dictionary. Translated by Brooks, Geoffrey. London, Annapolis, Md: Greenhill Books, Naval Institute Press. ISBN 1-55750-186-6.
- Busch, Rainer; Röll, Hans-Joachim (1999). Deutsche U-Boot-Verluste von September 1939 bis Mai 1945 [German U-boat losses from September 1939 to May 1945]. Der U-Boot-Krieg (in German). Vol. IV. Hamburg, Berlin, Bonn: Mittler. ISBN 3-8132-0514-2.
- Bishop, Chris (2006). Kriegsmarine U-Boats, 1939-45. London: Amber Books. ISBN 978-1-904687-96-2.
- Gröner, Erich; Jung, Dieter; Maass, Martin (1991). U-boats and Mine Warfare Vessels. German Warships 1815–1945. Vol. 2. Translated by Thomas, Keith; Magowan, Rachel. London: Conway Maritime Press. ISBN 0-85177-593-4.
