= German submarine U-244 =

German World War II submarine

Coordinates: 55°46′N 8°32′W

History

Nazi Germany
- Name: U-244
- Ordered: 10 April 1941
- Builder: Germaniawerft, Kiel
- Yard number: 678
- Laid down: 24 October 1942
- Launched: 2 September 1943
- Commissioned: 9 October 1943
- Fate: Sunk 14 May 1945

General characteristics
- Class & type: Type VIIC submarine
- Displacement: 769 tonnes (757 long tons) surfaced; 871 t (857 long tons) submerged
- Length: 67.10 m (220 ft 2 in) o/a; 50.50 m (165 ft 8 in) pressure hull
- Beam: 6.20 m (20 ft 4 in) o/a; 4.70 m (15 ft 5 in) pressure hull
- Height: 9.60 m (31 ft 6 in)
- Draught: 4.74 m (15 ft 7 in)
- Installed power: 2,800–3,200 PS (2,100–2,400 kW; 2,800–3,200 bhp) (diesels); 750 PS (550 kW; 740 shp) (electric)
- Propulsion: 2 shafts; 2 × diesel engines; 2 × electric motors
- Speed: 17.7 knots (32.8 km/h; 20.4 mph) surfaced; 7.6 knots (14.1 km/h; 8.7 mph) submerged
- Range: 8,500 nmi (15,700 km; 9,800 mi) at 10 knots (19 km/h; 12 mph) surfaced; 80 nmi (150 km; 92 mi) at 4 knots (7.4 km/h; 4.6 mph) submerged
- Test depth: 230 m (750 ft); Crush depth: 250–295 m (820–968 ft)
- Complement: 4 officers, 40–56 enlisted
- Armament: 5 × 53.3 cm (21 in) torpedo tubes (four bow, one stern); 14 × G7e torpedoes or 26 TMA mines; 1 × 8.8 cm (3.46 in) deck gun(220 rounds); 1 × 3.7 cm (1.5 in) Flak M42 AA gun; 2 × twin 2 cm (0.79 in) C/30 anti-aircraft guns

Service record
- Part of: 5th U-boat Flotilla; 9 October 1943 – 31 July 1944; 9th U-boat Flotilla; 1 August – 31 October 1944; 11th U-boat Flotilla; 1 November 1944 – 8 May 1945
- Identification codes: M 54 344
- Commanders: Oblt.z.S. / Kptlt. Ruprecht Fischer; 9 October 1943 – 9 April 1945; Oblt.z.S.d.R Hans-Peter Mackeprang; 10 April – 14 May 1945
- Operations: 4 patrols: 1st patrol: a. 9 August – 10 October 1944; b. 13 – 14 October 1944; c. 31 October – 1 November 1944; 2nd patrol: 12 – 23 December 1944; 3rd patrol: 9 January – 13 March 1945; 4th patrol: 15 April – 14 May 1945
- Victories: None

German submarine U-244 was a Type VIIC U-boat of Nazi Germany's Kriegsmarine during World War II. The submarine was laid down on 24 October 1942 at the Friedrich Krupp Germaniawerft yard at Kiel as yard number 678, launched on 2 September 1943 and commissioned on 9 September under the command of Oberleutnant zur See Ruprecht Fischer.

In four patrols, she sank no ships.

She surrendered to the Allies on 14 May 1945.

== Design ==
German Type VIIC submarines were preceded by the shorter Type VIIB submarines. U-244 had a displacement of 769 tonnes (757 long tons) when at the surface and 871 tonnes (857 long tons) while submerged. She had a total length of 67.10 m (220 ft 2 in), a pressure hull length of 50.50 m (165 ft 8 in), a beam of 6.20 m (20 ft 4 in), a height of 9.60 m (31 ft 6 in), and a draught of 4.74 m (15 ft 7 in). The submarine was powered by two Germaniawerft F46 four-stroke, six-cylinder supercharged diesel engines producing a total of 2,800 to 3,200 metric horsepower (2,060 to 2,350 kW; 2,760 to 3,160 shp) for use while surfaced, two AEG GU 460/8–27 double-acting electric motors producing a total of 750 metric horsepower (550 kW; 740 shp) for use while submerged. She had two shafts and two 1.23 m (4 ft) propellers. The boat was capable of operating at depths of up to 230 metres (750 ft).

The submarine had a maximum surface speed of 17.7 knots (32.8 km/h; 20.4 mph) and a maximum submerged speed of 7.6 knots (14.1 km/h; 8.7 mph). When submerged, the boat could operate for 80 nautical miles (150 km; 92 mi) at 4 knots (7.4 km/h; 4.6 mph); when surfaced, she could travel 8,500 nautical miles (15,700 km; 9,800 mi) at 10 knots (19 km/h; 12 mph). U-244 was fitted with five 53.3 cm (21 in) torpedo tubes (four fitted at the bow and one at the stern), fourteen torpedoes, one 8.8 cm (3.46 in) SK C/35 naval gun, (220 rounds), one 3.7 cm (1.5 in) Flak M42 and two twin 2 cm (0.79 in) C/30 anti-aircraft guns. The boat had a complement of between forty-four and sixty.

== Service history ==
After training with the 5th U-boat Flotilla at Kiel, U-244 was transferred to the 9th flotilla for front-line service on 1 August 1944. She was reassigned to the 11th flotilla on 1 November.

=== First patrol ===
The boat's first patrol was preceded by short trips between Kiel, Horten Naval Base in Norway and Bergen, also in Norway. It was while she was travelling between these latter two places that she was attacked by two Norwegian Mosquito aircraft of No. 333 Squadron RAF on 25 July 1944. One man was killed, seven others were wounded.

The patrol proper began with U-244's departure from Bergen on 9 August 1944. Her route took her south of Iceland. She returned to Bergen on 1 November.

=== Second and third patrols ===
More short voyages followed, between Bergen and Stavanger, but they were not listed as patrols. The boat's second sortie in December 1944, passed without incident.

Her third foray saw her reach as far as the English Channel, off Worthing. At 64 days, it was her longest patrol.

=== Fourth patrol ===
The submarine surrendered at Loch Eriboll in Scotland on 14 May 1945. Later that same day, she was being towed to scuttling grounds as part of Operation Deadlight when the tow parted; the boat was then sunk with gunfire from the Polish destroyer Piorun.

== Bibliography ==
- Busch, Rainer; Röll, Hans-Joachim (1999). German U-boat commanders of World War II : a biographical dictionary. Translated by Brooks, Geoffrey. London, Annapolis, Md: Greenhill Books, Naval Institute Press. ISBN 1-55750-186-6.
- Busch, Rainer; Röll, Hans-Joachim (1999). Deutsche U-Boot-Verluste von September 1939 bis Mai 1945 [German U-boat losses from September 1939 to May 1945]. Der U-Boot-Krieg (in German). Vol. IV. Hamburg, Berlin, Bonn: Mittler. ISBN 3-8132-0514-2.
- Gröner, Erich; Jung, Dieter; Maass, Martin (1991). U-boats and Mine Warfare Vessels. German Warships 1815–1945. Vol. 2. Translated by Thomas, Keith; Magowan, Rachel. London: Conway Maritime Press. ISBN 0-85177-593-4.
