= 9th U-boat Flotilla =

- Der lachende Sägefisch – "The laughing Sawfish"
- Active: Raised 1941, Dissolved 1945
- Country: Nazi Germany
- Branch: Kriegsmarine
- Type: U-boat flotilla
- Garrison/HQ: Brest

Commanders
- Notable commanders: Korvettenkapitän Heinrich Lehmann-Willenbrock

The 9th U-boat Flotilla (German 9. Unterseebootsflottille) was formed in October 1941 in Brest. It became operational in April 1942, after the first combat ready U-boat, U-213, reached the Brest base on 20 March 1942. The flotilla operated mostly various marks of the Type VII U-boat and it concentrated its efforts mainly in the North Atlantic, against convoys to and from Great Britain. The flotilla served from Brest until the base was threatened with being captured by American forces. The last of the flotilla's U-boats, the U-256 left Brest on 4 September 1944 for Bergen, Norway, and this marked the end of the 9th Flotilla. All its surviving boats were reassigned to the 11th U-boat Flotilla in Bergen.

The symbol of the 9th Flotilla, Der lachende Sägefisch or the "laughing Sawfish" became the unit symbol after Lehmann-Willenbrock assumed command. It has previously been the conning tower emblem on his previous command, U-96 of "Das Boot" fame.

== Flotilla commanders ==
Duration	Rank	Commander
October 1941 – February 1942	Kapitänleutnant	Jürgen Oesten
May 1942 – September 1944	Korvettenkapitän	Heinrich Lehmann-Willenbrock

== U-boats of the Flotilla ==
U-89	U-90	U-91	U-92	U-210	U-211	U-213
U-214	U-215	U-216	U-217	U-218	U-230	U-232
U-240	U-244	U-248	U-254	U-256	U-273	U-279
U-282	U-283	U-284	U-293	U-296	U-302	U-309
U-317	U-347	U-348	U-365	U-377	U-383	U-388
U-389	U-403	U-407	U-408	U-409	U-412	U-421
U-425	U-438	U-443	U-447	U-450	U-473	U-480
U-482	U-591	U-595	U-604	U-605	U-606	U-621
U-631	U-633	U-634	U-638	U-659	U-660	U-663
U-664	U-709	U-715	U-739	U-744	U-755	U-759
U-761	U-762	U-764	U-771	U-772	U-951	U-954
U-955	U-966	U-979	U-984	U-989	U-997	U-1165
