= 8th U-boat Flotilla =

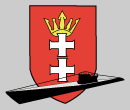
- Active: Raised 1941, Dissolved 1945
- Country: Nazi Germany
- Branch: Kriegsmarine
- Type: U-boat flotilla
- Garrison/HQ: Königsberg, Danzig

Commanders
- Notable commanders: Kapitänleutnant Georg-Wilhelm Schulz

The 8th U-boat Flotilla (German 8. Unterseebootsflottille) was formed in June 1941 in Königsberg under the command of Kapitänleutnant Georg-Wilhelm Schulz, who also at this time commanded the 6th U-boat Flotilla in Danzig. It was primarily a training flotilla but in the last months of the war some flotilla boats were in combat against the Soviet Navy in the Baltic Sea. The flotilla was disbanded in January 1945.

== Commanders ==
Duration	Commander
October 1941 – January 1942	Kapitänleutnant Georg-Wilhelm Schulz
January 1942 – January 1943	Korvettenkapitän Hans Eckermann
January 1943 – March 1943	Kapitän zur See Bruno Mahn (in deputize)
January 1943 – April 1944	Korvettenkapitän Werner von Schmidt
May 1944 – January 1945	Fregattenkapitän Hans Pauckstadt
